= List of Latin and Greek words commonly used in systematic names =

List of terms used in biology

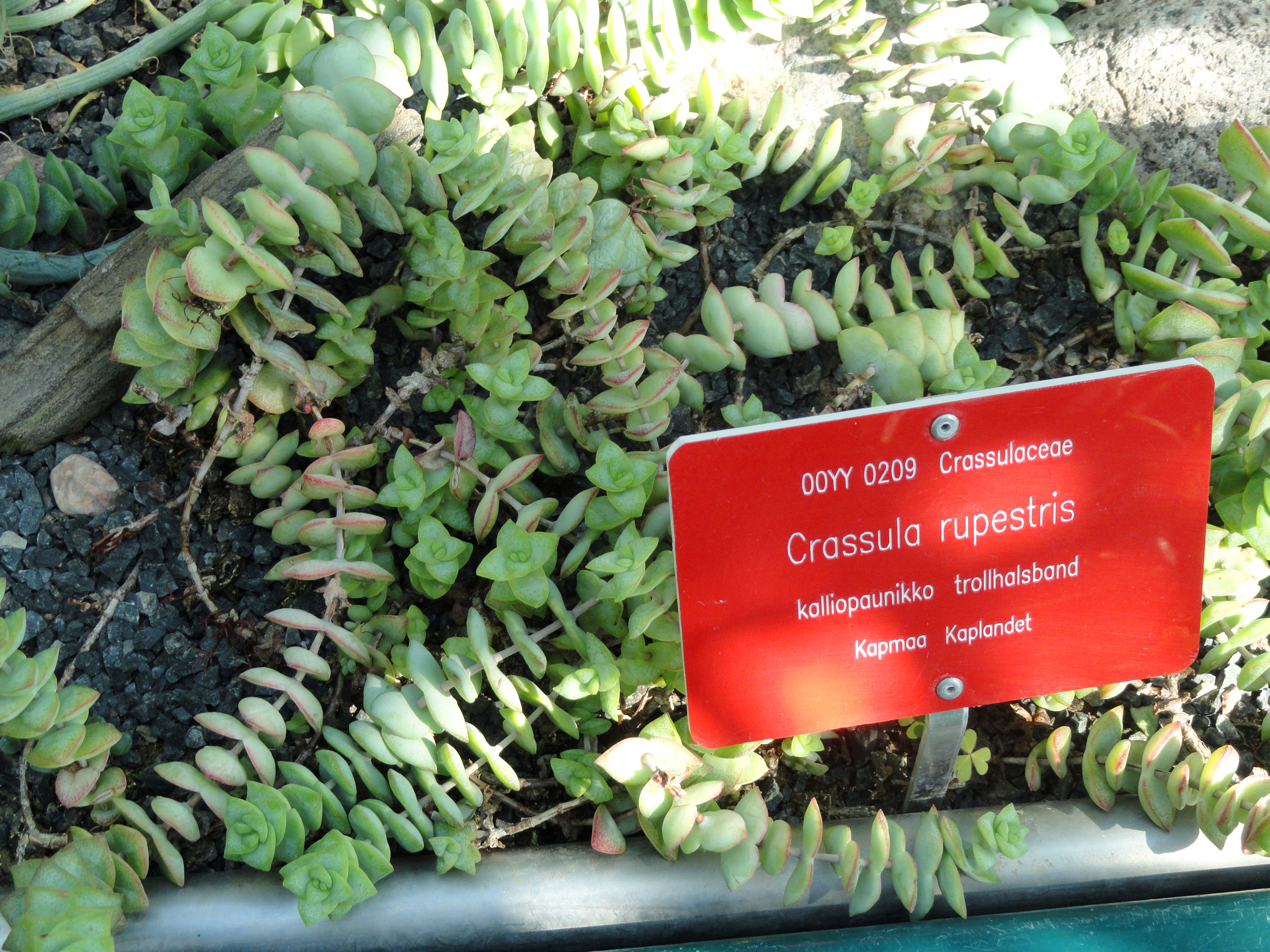
A sign for Crassula rupestris at the University of Helsinki Botanical Garden. The roots for the binomial name are crassus (thick, fat) and rupestris (living on cliffs or rocks)

This list of Latin and Greek words commonly used in systematic names is intended to help those unfamiliar with classical languages to understand and remember the scientific names of organisms. The binomial nomenclature used for animals and plants is largely derived from Latin and Greek words, as are some of the names used for higher taxa, such as orders and above. At the time when biologist Carl Linnaeus (1707–1778) published the books that are now accepted as the starting point of binomial nomenclature, Latin was used in Western Europe as the common language of science, and scientific names were in Latin or Greek: Linnaeus continued this practice.

While learning Latin is now less common, it is still used by classical scholars, and for certain purposes in botany, medicine and the Roman Catholic Church, and it can still be found in scientific names. It is helpful to be able to understand the source of scientific names. Although the Latin names do not always correspond to the current English common names, they are often related, and if their meanings are understood, they are easier to recall. The binomial name often reflects limited knowledge or hearsay about a species at the time it was named. For instance Pan troglodytes, the chimpanzee, and Troglodytes troglodytes, the wren, are not necessarily cave-dwellers.

Sometimes a genus name or specific descriptor is simply the Latin or Greek name for the animal (e.g. Canis is Latin for dog). These words may not be included in the table below if they only occur for one or two taxa. Instead, the words listed below are the common adjectives and other modifiers that repeatedly occur in the scientific names of many organisms (in more than one genus). Genus names each have a single grammatical gender: masculine, feminine, or neuter. This gender may determine the spelling of adjectival species names within the genus.

Many adjectives vary in spelling according to gender, and in most cases only the lemma form (nominative singular masculine form) is listed here. 1st-and-2nd-declension adjectives end in -us (masculine), -a (feminine) and -um (neuter), whereas 3rd-declension adjectives ending in -is (masculine and feminine) change to -e (neuter). For example, verus is listed without the variants for Aloe vera or Galium verum. Among the various Nomenclatural codes, the practice of gender agreement is uniform in most respects, though the International Code of Zoological Nomenclature includes several unique provisions that allow fewer words to be considered adjectives than under other Codes, such as treating any compound name where at least one component is a noun as a "noun phrase", even if the other component (or the compound itself) is adjectival (e.g., the name leucocephalus is an adjective in botany, but a noun phrase in zoology, so only in the former case would the name change spelling to match the genus).

The second part of a binomial is often a person's name in the genitive case, ending -i (masculine) or -ae (feminine), such as Kaempfer's tody-tyrant, Hemitriccus kaempferi. The name may be converted into a Latinised form first, giving -ii and -iae instead.

Words that are very similar to their English forms have been omitted.

Some of the Greek transliterations given are Ancient Greek, and others are Modern Greek.

In the tables, L = Latin, G = Greek, and LG = similar in both languages.

== A ==
Latin/Greek	Language	English	Example	Search for titles containing the word or using the prefix:
acanthus etc.	G ἄκανθος (ákanthos)	thorny, spiny	Acanthus plant; Parorchis acanthus, a flatworm Munida acantha, a squat lobster; prickly ceratina, Ceratina acantha spiny dogfish, Squalus acanthias; Reinhardt's snake-eater, Polemon acanthias cotton thistle, Onopordum acanthium	– – –
acaulis	G, L	stemless	silver thistle, Carlina acaulis; dwarf date palm, Phoenix acaulis	–
actin-, actino-	G ἀκτίς (aktis)	ray, radial	Schefflera actinophylla, Actinopterygii, Actinophryida	–
acutus	L	sharpened, pointed	American crocodile, Crocodylus acutus; angled sunbeam (butterfly), Curetis acuta; northern pintail, Anas acuta	– –
aculeatus	L	prickly	short-beaked echidna, Tachyglossus aculeatus; three-spined stickleback, Gasterosteus aculeatus; butcher's-broom, Ruscus aculeatus	– –
acuminatus	L	sharp, pointed, tapering	Jamaican gooseberry tree, Phyllanthus acuminatus; Panaeolus acuminatus, a mushroom cucumbertree, Magnolia acuminata; Musa acuminata, a banana tree acuminate barrenwort, Epimedium acuminatum; desert quandong, Santalum acuminatum	– –
adustus	L	singed, burnt	side-striped jackal, Canis adustus; dark onyx cowry, Erronea adusta	– –
aequalis	L	equal	common Atlantic grenadier, Nezumia aequalis; clay-coloured billbug, Sphenophorus aequalis Trogoxylon aequale, a beetle; Omophron aequale, a ground beetle	–
aestivus	L	summer	summer asphodel, Asphodelus aestivus; rough green snake, Opheodrys aestivus turquoise-fronted amazon, Amazona aestiva; summer spider orchid, Caladenia aestiva Loddon lily, Leucojum aestivum; common wheat, Triticum aestivum	– –
affinis	L	neighbouring, similar, kindred	lesser scaup, Aythya affinis; dugite, Pseudonaja affinis blue tongue, Melastoma affine; Persian violet, Exacum affine	–
africanus	L	African	reed cormorant, Microcarbo africanus; southern African frilled shark, Chlamydoselachus africana; African clubhook-squid, Notonykia africanae; pyjama shark, Poroderma africanum; lemon basil, Ocimum × africanum	–, –
agrestis	L	of the field, wild	field vole, Microtus agrestis; green field-speedwell, Veronica agrestis	–
alatus	L āla	winged	pitcher plant, Nepenthes alata; sharpwing monkeyflower, Mimulus alatus; winged elm, Ulmus alata; winged everlasting, Ammobium alatum; winged loosestrife, Lythrum alatum; winged seahorse, Hippocampus alatus; winged-stem passion flower, Passiflora alata	– –
albiceps	L	white-headed	blow fly, Chrysomya albiceps; moth, Syngamia albiceps; wood groundling, Parachronistis albiceps; Mexican golden red rump tarantula, Brachypelma albiceps	
albidens	L	white-toothed	white-toothed brush mouse, Coccymys albidens; see also leucodon	
albimanus	L albus, manus	white handed	Anopheles albimanus; Aulonia albimana, white-knuckled wolf spider; Habrocestum albimanum	– –
albopictus	L	painted white	Asian tiger mosquito, Aedes albopictus; Moneilema albopictum	– –
albus	L	white	white ibis, Eudocimus albus; white oak, Quercus alba; mistletoe, Viscum album	– –
alpinus	L	alpine; of the Alps	alpine aster, Aster alpinus; alpine bearberry, Arctostaphylos alpina; alpine feverfew, Parthenium alpinum	– –
amabilis	L	lovable	lovable lily, Lilium amabile; lovely cotinga, Cotinga amabilis; lovely fairywren, Malurus amabilis; lovely fir, Abies amabilis	–
ambiguus	L	uncertain	beautiful woolly sunflower, Eriophyllum ambiguum; doubtful cone, Conus ambiguus; questionable Stropharia, Stropharia ambigua; tick bush, Kunzea ambigua	– –
amblys	G ἀμβλύς (amblús)	blunt, dull	marine iguana, Amblyrhynchus cristatus	–
americanus	L	American	American black bear, Ursus americanus; American hazel nut, Corylus americana; American mastodon, Mammut americanum	– –
amphi-	G ἀμφί (amphí)	of all kinds, on all sides	amphibian; Amphipoda	
ampulla	L	bottle, flask	northern bottlenose whale, Hyperoodon ampullatus	– – –
amurensis	L	from the Amur River	Amur grape, Vitis amurensis	–
anglicus	L	from England	Common cordgrass, Sporobolus anglicus; Bibio anglicus, a fly; English sundew, Drosera anglica; English whitebeam, Sorbus anglica; English stonecrop, Sedum anglicum	– –
angolensis	L	from Angola	African teak, Pterocarpus angolensis	–
angustiflorus	L	narrow-flowered	Eastwood's bellflower, Campanula angustiflora; narrowflower lupine, Lupinus angustiflorus	– –
angustifolius	L	narrow-leaved	narrowleaf cottongrass, Eriophorum angustifolium; narrowleaf cottonwood, Populus angustifolia; narrowleaf sunflower, Helianthus angustifolius	– –
angustus	L	narrow	narrow-banded widow, Dingana angusta; narrowleaf pansy monkeyflower, Mimulus angustatus; slimleaf bean, Phaseolus angustissimus; Prairie acacia, Acaciella angustissima; sea snail, Vexillum angustissimum	– – – – – –
antarcticus	L	of the southern hemisphere	chinstrap penguin, Pygoscelis antarcticus; gummy shark, Mustelus antarcticus; brown skua, Stercorarius antarcticus	– –
anthos	G ἄνθος (ánthos)	flower	anthozoans, Anthozoa; golden wattle, Acacia pycnantha;	
anthropo-	G ἄνθρωπος (ánthrōpos)	man, human being	Paranthropus	
apis	L	bee	western honey bee, Apis mellifera; white sage, Salvia apiana	– – –
aquaticus	L	found near water	eastern mole, Scalopus aquaticus; wild rice, Zizania aquatica; water spinach, Ipomoea aquatica; parrot's-feather, Myriophyllum aquaticum,	– –
arborescens	L	tree-like or shrub-like	Artemisia arborescens; Aloe arborescens; Hydrangea arborescens	
archaeo-	G ἀρχαῖος (arkhaîos)	ancient	Archaeopteryx	–
arch-, archi-, archo-, -archus	G ἀρχός (arkhos)	ruler, leader, prince, highest, greatest	Archidendron grandiflorum	– –
arctos	G ἄρκτος (árktos)	bear	grizzly bear, Ursus arctos horribilis; common bearberry, Arctostaphylos	–
arena	L	sand	sand iris, Iris arenaria; sand rock-cress, Arabidopsis arenosa; sand seatrout, Cynoscion arenarius; sand-dusted cone, Conus arenatus	– – – – –
arenicolus	L	sand-dwelling	dunes sagebrush lizard, Sceloporus arenicolus; sand goldenrod, Solidago arenicola; sanddwelling dewberry, Rubus arenicola; sandy stargazer, Gillellus arenicola	–
argentatus	L	silvery	European herring gull, Larus argentatus	– –
argenteus	L	silvery	silver buffaloberry, Shepherdia argentea; silver tree, Leucadendron argenteum; silvery lupine, Lupinus argenteus; white mulberry, Pipturus argenteus	– –
argentum	L	silver	sea snail, Calliostoma argentum	
argillicola	L	living on clay	clay Fiddler Crab, Minuca argillicola; Hullsia argillicola	
aromatica	G ἄρωμα (árōma)	aromatic	clove nutmeg, Ravensara aromatica; Croton aromaticus; clove, Syzygium aromaticum	– –
arthro-	G ἄρθρον (árthron)	joint	Arthropoda	
arvensis	L	in the field	skylark, Alauda arvensis; field horsetail, Equisetum arvense	–
asiatica	L	Asian	white-winged dove, Zenaida asiatica; Caspian plover, Charadrius asiaticus, Persian buttercup, Ranunculus asiaticus, Lanmaoa asiatica	–
asperum	L	rough, uneven	freckled dapperling, Echinoderma asperum; pied warty frog, Theloderma asperum prickly chaff flower, Achyranthes aspera; Papuan ground boa, Candoia aspera	–
astro-, astero-	G ἄστρον (ástron)	star	starfish (class), Asteroidea	–
ater	L	dull black	common chuckwalla, Sauromalus ater; Eurasian coot, Fulica atra; black swan, Cygnus atratus; black yarrow, Achillea atrata; creek chub, Semotilus atromaculatus see also niger	– – – – –
atropurpureus	L	deep purple, blackish-purple	Acer palmatum 'Atropurpureum'; Berberis thunbergii f. atropurpurea; purple-flowered cotoneaster, Cotoneaster atropurpureus	– –
aurantius, aurantiacus	L	orange-colored	bitter orange, Citrus aurantium	– –; – –
aureus	L	golden	golden jackal, Canis aureus; Staphylococcus aureus (bacteria) see also chrysos	– –
auritus	L	having (large) ears	brown long-eared bat, Plecotus auritus; double-crested cormorant, Phalacrocorax auritus; long-eared hedgehog, Hemiechinus auritus moon jellyfish, Aurelia aurita yerba santa, Piper auritum; blue eared pheasant, Crossoptilon auritum	– –
australis	L	southern	southern right whale, Eubalaena australis	–

== B ==
Latin/Greek	Language	English	Examples	Search for titles containing the word or using the prefix:
baccatus	L	berry-bearing	common yew, Taxus baccata; Conus baccatus, a sea snail	– –
barbatus	L barba	bearded	bearded catasetum, Catasetum barbatum; bearded seal, Erignathus barbatus; black-chinned siskin, Spinus barbata; Bornean bearded pig, Sus barbatus; golden-beard penstemon, Penstemon barbatus	– –
bicolor	L	two-colored	bicolor angelfish, Centropyge bicolor; bicolor cleanerfish, Labroides bicolor; bicolored moth, Manulea bicolor	
bicoloratus	L	two-colored	bicolored angle, Macaria bicolorata; Kenya two-headed snake, Micrelaps bicoloratus; orchid, Bulbophyllum bicoloratum	– –
bicornis	L	two-horned	black rhinoceros, Diceros bicornis	
biennis	L	of two years, lasting two years	Crepis biennis	
bios	G βίος (bíos)	life	amphibian; biota, all living things	
blandus	L	pleasant, smooth, alluring	Greek windflower, Anemone blanda; Mallos blandus, a spider	– –
borealis	L	northern	northern right whale dolphin, Lissodelphis borealis sei whale, Balaenoptera borealis northern bedstraw, Galium boreale	–
brachion	G βραχίων (brakhíōn)	arm	Przewalski's gerbil, Brachiones przewalskii; Brachiopoda (phylum); Brachiosaurus	
brasiliensis	L	Brazilian	Brazilian brown bat Eptesicus brasiliensis	
brachy-	G βραχύς (brakhús)	short	Brazilian gold frog, Brachycephalus didactylus	
brachyphyllus	G	short-leaved	extinct plant genus, Brachyphyllum; flower, Colchicum brachyphyllum; leaf-nosed bats, Brachyphylla; shortleaf baccharis, Baccharis brachyphylla; see also brevifolius	– –
brady-	G βραδύς (bradús)	slow	pygmy three-toed sloth, Bradypus pygmaeus	
branchia	G βράγχιον (bránkhion)	gills	Lamellibranchia (class, syn. Bivalva); Branchiopoda (class, brine shrimps)	
brasiliensis	L	from Brazil	Brazilian marsh rat, Holochilus brasiliensis; Brazilian stick mantis, Brunneria brasiliensis; rubber tree, Hevea brasiliensis	–
brevi-	L brevis	short	silvery-cheeked hornbill, Ceratogymna brevis	– –
brevicaudatus	L	short-tailed	bearded leaf chameleon, Rieppeleon brevicaudatus; sea snail, Lophiotoma brevicaudata; short-tailed ceratosoma, Ceratosoma brevicaudatum	– –
brevicollis	L	short-necked	short-necked oil beetle, Meloe brevicollis	–
brevifolius	L	short-leaved	Joshua tree, Yucca brevifolia; short-leaved dudleya, Dudleya blochmaniae subsp. brevifolia; shortleaf sneezeweed, Helenium brevifolium; zig-zag bog-rush, Schoenus brevifolius; see also brachyphyllus	– –
brevirostris	L	short beak	pignosed arrowtooth eel, Dysomma brevirostre; shortnose ponyfish, Leiognathus brevirostris	–
britannicus	L	from Great Britain	Rumex britannica, a knotweed; British yellowhead, Inula britannica; Cortinarius britannicus, a mushroom; Geastrum britannicum, an earthstar fungus	– –
brumalis	L	winter	mid-winter boreu, Boreus brumalis; kauri greenhood, Pterostylis brumalis Muscat truffle, Tuber brumale; winter stalkball fungus, Tulostoma brumale	–
bulbus	G βολβός	bulb	bulbous buttercup, Ranunculus bulbosus; onion cone, Conus bulbus	– –

== C ==
Latin/Greek	Language	English	Examples	Search for titles containing the word or using the prefix:
caecus	L	blind	blind mole, Talpa caeca; northern eyed hawkmoth, Smerinthus caecus	– –
caeruleus	L	blue	Eurasian blue tit, Cyanistes caeruleus; blue passion flower, Passiflora caerulea	– –
californicus	L	California	California blue dorid, Felimare californiensis	– –
callosus	L	calloused	large vesper mouse, Calomys callosus; tree fern, Cyathea callosa; orchid, Paphiopedilum callosum	– –
calvus	L	bald	Altolamprologus calvus, Isbrueckerichthys calvus, both fish Banasa calva, a stink bug; Trichocorixa calva, a water boatman Intrasporangium calvum, a bacterium; Bulbophyllum calvum, an orchid	–
cambricus	L, from Cambria	from Wales	wild cotoneaster, Cotoneaster cambricus; Alalcomenaeus cambricus, fossil arthropod Welsh wave, Venusia cambrica; Welsh eyebright, Euphrasia cambrica Welsh poppy, Papaver cambricum; limestone polypody, Polypodium cambricum Welsh groundsel, Senecio cambrensis; Flexicalymene cambrensis, a fossil trilobite	– – –
campestris	L	of the field	tawny pipit, Anthus campestris; steenbok, Raphicerus campestris field maple, Acer campestre; field pepperwort, Lepidium campestre	–
canadensis	L	from Canada	bighorn sheep, Ovis canadensis	–
candidus	L	brightly white, shining white	Madonna lily, Lilium candidum	– –
canescens	L	turning grey- or white-haired	Geraea canescens (desert sunflower); Atriplex canescens	
canis	L	dog	coyote, Canis latrans; Dipylidium caninum (a tapeworm)	– – –
canorus	L canōrus	melodious	common cuckoo, Cuculus canorus; Chinese hwamei, Garrulax canorus Cuban grassquit, Phonipara canora; Campylocheta canora, a tachinid fly	– –
canus	L	gray (haired), pale gray	grey-headed woodpecker, Picus canus; woolly groundsel, Senecio canus	– –
caprae	L	of a goat	Staphylococcus caprae	–
castaneus	L	chestnut(-colored)	chestnut bolete, Gyroporus castaneus; reddish carpenter ant, Camponotus castaneus chestnut, Castanea; chestnut short-tailed bat, Carollia castanea chestnut leek orchid, Prasophyllum castaneum; red flour beetle, Tribolium castaneum	– –
cauda	L	tail	long-tailed tit, Aegithalos caudatus; thintail skate, Dipturus leptocaudus; northern short-tailed shrew, Blarina brevicauda	
caulos	G καυλός (kaulós)	stem, stalk	stemless gentian, Gentiana acaulis	–
cephalo-	G κεφαλή (kephalḗ)	head	Mediterranean gull, Larus melanocephalus; blue-spotted grouper, Cephalopholis argus	
-ceps	L caput	head	pygmy sperm whale, Kogia breviceps; biceps (two-headed muscle)	
ceros	L cornū G κέρας (kéras)	horn	narwal, Monodon monoceros; rhinoceros (nose horn)	
cest	L cestus G κεστός (kestós)	girdle, belt, stitched	Cestoda	
chaetes	G χαίτη (khaítē)	flowing hair, or mane	wildebeest, Connochaetes gnou; bristle worms, Polychaeta; earthworms, Oligochaeta	
chilensis	L	from Chile	paradise tanager, Tangara chilensis	–
chinensis	L	from China	China rose, Rosa chinensis; Chinese onion, Allium chinense; Chinese sumac, Rhus chinensis; see also Sinense, below	–
chloro-	G χλωρός (khlōrós)	pale green	common moorhen, Gallinula chloropus; green algae, Chlorophyta	
chordatus	L	spined	chordates; Stylephorus chordatus, Tinospora cordifolia	– –
chroma	G χρῶμα (khrôma)	color	clown loach, Chromobotia macracanthus	
chrysos	G χρυσός (khrusós)	gold	Chrysochloridae (golden moles); golden pheasant, Chrysolophus pictus; maned wolf, Chrysocyon brachyurus; Chrysophyceae (golden algae) see also aureus	
chrysophyllus	G	gold-leaved	golden chinquapin, Chrysolepis chrysophylla; golden-leaved Jerusalem sage, Phlomis chrysophylla; satinleaf, Chrysophyllum oliviforme	– –
cilium	L	eyelash	Ashland thistle, Cirsium ciliolatum; bristleworm, Polydora ciliata; eyelash gecko, Correlophus ciliatus; queen angelfish, Holacanthus ciliaris; Australian red cedar, Toona ciliata; sickle-leaved cymodocea, Thalassodendron ciliatum	– – – – –
cinereus	L	ash, ash-colored	masked shrew, Sorex cinereus; Australian sea lion, Neophoca cinerea; gray thrasher, Toxostoma cinereum; common gray fox, Urocyon cinereoargenteus	– –
cirrhus	G κιρρός (kirrhós)	orange	fringe-lipped bat, Trachops cirrhosus; mrigal carp, Cirrhinus cirrhosus; silverspotted sculpin, Blepsias cirrhosus	– –
citri	L	citrus	the citrus blossom moth, Prays citri	
colchicus	L	from Colchis (Greek Κολχῐ́ς, Kolchís) or Georgia	common pheasant, Phasianus colchicus; Phoxinus colchicus, a minnow Caucasian bladdernut, Staphylea colchica; Colchic holly, Ilex colchica Colchic nase, Chondrostoma colchicum; Cyclamen colchicum, a primrose	– –
cneme	G κνήμη (knḗmē)	shin, leg	white-legged damselfly, Platycnemis pennipes	
-cola	L -cola	inhabitant	Eurasian woodcock, Scolopax rusticola; paddyfield warbler, Acrocephalus agricola The forms -colus and -colum are also found, although they are not considered to be correct Latin: deepwater grenadier, Coryphaenoides profundicolus; black-sided flowerpecker, Dicaeum monticolum.	
clathratus	L	grated, latticed	kelp bass, Paralabrax clathratus; clathrate nassa, Nassarius clathratus slender-armed starfish, Luidia clathrata; latticed sandperch, Parapercis clathrata Allium clathratum, an onion; Vexillum clathratum, a sea snail	– –
collaris	L	collared	ring-necked duck, Aythya collaris; collared pika, Ochotona collaris collared carpetshark, Parascyllium collare; mottled sand grasshopper, Spharagemon collare	–
communis	L	common	common juniper, Juniperus communis; common myrtle, Myrtus communis star jelly, Nostoc commune; great golden maidenhair, Polytrichum commune	–
compressus	L compressus	slender, pressed together	slender oatgrass, Danthonia compressa; slender crayfish, Faxonius compressus emerald cockroach wasp, Ampulex compressa; empire gudgeon, Hypseleotris compressa Dendrobium compressum, an orchid	– –
concolor	L	having uniform color throughout	cougar, Puma concolor; white fir, Abies concolor	
conno-	G κόννος (kónnos)	beard	wildebeest, Connochaetes gnou	
copros	G κόπρος (kópros)	excrement	Copris, genus of dung beetles; coprophilous, 'growing on animal dung'	
corax	L corvus G κόραξ (kórax)	crow, raven	common raven, Corvus corax	
cordatus	L	heart-shaped	cordate (leaf shape); small-leaved lime, Tilia cordata; sea potato, Echinocardium cordatum	– –
cordifolius	L	heart-shaped leaves	heartleaf aster, Symphyotrichum cordifolium; heart-leaved moonseed, Tinospora cordifolia; Tucson bur ragweed, Ambrosia cordifolia	– –
coriaceus	L, from corium ("leather")	leathery	Pajahuello tick, Ornithodoros coriaceus; beach bird's eye, Alectryon coriaceus blue china vine, Holboellia coriacea; leatherback sea turtle, Dermochelys coriacea green tea-tree, Leptospermum coriaceum; inland rock orchid, Dendrobium coriaceum	– –
cornu	L cornū	horn	garden snail, Cornu aspersum; great ramshorn, Planorbarius corneus	
coronatus	L	crowned	crowned lemur, Eulemur coronatus; crowned turban shell, Lunella coronata	– –
coryth-	G κόρυθος (korythos), genitive of κόρυς (korys)	helmet	Corythucha, moth genus; Corythaica, bug genus; Corythoxestis, moth genus	
costatus	L	ribbed	ribbed slipper shell, Maoricrypta costata; striped Raphael catfish, Platydoras costatus	– –
crassus, crassi-	L	thick, fat	creeping blueberry, Vaccinium crassifolium; inflated spiny crab, Rochinia crassa; mouthless crab, Cardisoma crassum	– –
cristatus	L	crested	aardwolf, Proteles cristatus; blue jay, Cyanocitta cristata; crested wheatgrass, Agropyron cristatum	– –
crocos	G κρόκος (krókos)	yellow	bicoloured white-toothed shrew, Crocidura leucodon; saffron, Crocus sativus; spotted hyena, Crocuta crocuta	
cryo-	G κρύος (krúos)	cold	Cryodraco; Cryolophosaurus; Cryosophila	
crypto-	G κρυπτός (kruptós)	hidden	Cryptococcus; Cryptosporidium	
culminicola	L	summit dweller	Elaeocarpus culminicola; Euxoa culminicola; Pinus culminicola, Potosi pinyon	
cursor	L	runner, racer	cream-coloured courser, Cursorius cursor; cursorial akodont, Akodon cursor; Lacépède's ground snake, Erythrolamprus cursor	
curvirostris	L	curved beak	boxer snipe eel, Nemichthys curvirostris; curve-billed thrasher, Toxostoma curvirostre	–
cyano-	G κυανός (kuanós)	blue-green	azure-winged magpie, Cyanopica cyanus; big blue octopus, Octopus cyanea; blue orchid, Aganisia cyanea	– – –

== D ==
Latin/Greek	Language	English	Example	Search for titles containing the word or using the prefix:
dactyl-, dactylo-	G δάκτυλος (dáktulos)	finger or toe	black-legged kittiwake, Rissa tridactyla; Pterodactylus	
deca-, deka-	G δέκα (déka)	ten	alfonsino, Beryx decadactylus	
decem	L	ten	Colorado potato beetle, Leptinotarsa decemlineata	
delphis	G δελφύς (delphús)	womb	virginia opossum, Didelphis virginiana	
dendr-, dendri-, dendro-, -dendron, -dendrum	G δένδρον (déndron)	tree	Philodendron, Dendrobium, Rhododendron	– –
derma	G δέρμα (dérma)	skin	yellow staining mushroom, Agaricus xanthodermus	
di-	G δι- (di-)	two	Christmas orchid, Dipodium punctatum	Too common a letter combination for any useful search
diffusus	L diffundere	diffuse	diffuse spineflower, Chorizanthe diffusa; fly, Paralimnophila diffusior; rush, Juncus diffusissimus; spreading groundsmoke, Gayophytum diffusum; spreading lupine, Lupinus diffusus; spreading phlox, Phlox diffusa	– – – –
digitatus	L	having fingers	finger rush Juncus digitatus; baobab, Adansonia digitata; dead man's fingers, Alcyonium digitatum	– –
dilatatus	L	dilated, extended	dallisgrass, Paspalum dilatatum; Maianthemum dilatatum	– –
dioica	L	dioicous	common nettle, Urtica dioica	
dino-, deino-	G δεινός (deinós)	terrifying	dinosaur, Deinotherium	
diplo-	G διπλός (diplós)	double	two-eyed orange spider, Diploglena capensis	
disc, disk	G δίσκος (dískos)	disc	common fungus moth, Metalectra discalis	– –
dodeca-	G δώδεκα (dṓdeka)	twelve	Henderson's shootingstar, Dodecatheon hendersonii	
dolicho-	G δολιχός (dolikhós)	elongated, long	knight anole, Anolis dolichocephalus	
domesticus	L	of the house or domestic	domestic pig, Sus scrofa domestica; house sparrow, Passer domesticus	– –
dorsum	L	back	back-striped weasel, Mustela strigidorsa	
dubius	L	doubtful	little ringed plover, Charadrius dubius see also nomina dubia	–
dulcis	L	sweet	almond, Prunus dulcis	–
dumetorum	L, from dumus, "bramble"	"of the thickets"	Blyth's reed warbler, Acrocephalus dumetorum; bitter yam, Dioscorea dumetorum; coastal green hairstreak, Callophrys dumetorum	
dumicola	L	scrub dweller	Acaena dumicola; Cerbera dumicola; Stegodyphus dumicola, African social spider	

== E ==
Latin/Greek	Language	English	Example	Search for titles containing the word or using the prefix:
eburneus	L eburneus	ivory-colored	ivory gull, Pagophila eburnea	– –
echinatus	L	prickly, spiny	Edisto crayfish, Procambarus echinatus; shortleaf pine, Pinus echinata	– –
echino-	L echīnus G ἐχῖνος (ekhînos)	hedgehog, sea-urchin	great globe thistle, Echinops sphaerocephalus; diadema urchin, Echinothrix diadema; San Pedro cactus, Echinopsis pachanoi	
edulis	L	edible	common cockle, Cerastoderma edule; king bolete, Boletus edulis; oyster, Ostrea edulis; passion fruit, Passiflora edulis; Moso bamboo, Phyllostachys edulis	–
elatior	L	taller	true oxlip, Primula elatior	
electro-	G ἤλεκτρον (ḗlektron)	amber, amber-colored or electric (modern usage)	broad-billed motmot, Electron platyrhynchum; electric eel, Electrophorus electricus	No simple way to distinguish biological from other uses
elegans	L	elegant	crimson rosella, Platycercus elegans ; Granastyochus elegantissimus; Iris iberica subsp. elegantissima; false aralia, Plerandra elegantissima; Caecum elegantissimum	– – –
emarginatus	L	having no edges	Phongolo suckermouth, Chiloglanis emarginatus; Gibraltar sea lavender, Limonium emarginatum; acerola, Malpighia emarginata; bitter cherry, Prunus emarginata	– –
enanti-	G ἐναντίος (enantíos)	opposite, against	Enantiornithes	
ennea-	G ἐννέα (ennéa)	nine	banded sunfish Enneacanthus obesus; scurvy-grass sorrel, Oxalis enneaphylla	
ensatus	L	sword-like	California giant salamander, Dicamptodon ensatus	– –
ensis, ensi-	L	sword, lance	jackknife clam, Ensis minor; swordleaf rush, Juncus ensifolius	–
-ensis	L	of, from (a place)	Tadarida brasiliensis (Brazilian free-tailed bat); Lucy, Australopithecus afarensis	
eques	L	knight, horseman	North Atlantic codling, Lepidion eques ; western horse lubber grasshopper, Taeniopoda eques; leafy seadragon, Phycodurus eques Aspergillus equitis; Cygnus equitum; Hoheria equitum	
erectus	L	upright	Homo erectus ("upright man"); upright chickweed, Moenchia erecta	– –
erio-	G ἔριον (érion)	wool, woolly	common cottongrass, Eriophorum angustifolium	
erosus	L	indented, jagged, serrated	jícama, Pachyrhizus erosus; serrated hinge-back tortoise, Kinixys erosa	– –
erythro-	G ἐρυθρός (eruthrós)	red	spotted redshank, Tringa erythropus; dog's-tooth violet, Erythronium dens-canis	
esculentus	L	edible	edible frog, Pelophylax kl. esculentus; Gyromitra esculenta	
europaeus	L	European	European hedgehog, Erinaceus europaeus; European owl moth, Brahmaea europaea	– –
Euryops	G	wide-eyed	euryops, plant genus; Goiter blacksmelt, Bathylagus euryops	
excelsus	L	exalted	African teak, Milicia excelsa; excelsior cone, Conus excelsus	– –
exiguus	L	small, slight	scanty frog, Cophixalus exiguus; tongue louse, Cymothoa exigua; obese thorn snail, Carychium exiguum	– –

== F ==
Latin/Greek	Language	English	Examples	Search for titles containing the word or using the prefix:
fallax	L	false	false swift, Borbo fallax; green marvel, Acronicta fallax	
falx	L	sickle	sickle milkvetch, Astragalus falcatus; sickle-leaved hare's-ear, Bupleurum falcatum; sicklethorn, Asparagus falcatus; wild pear, Persoonia falcata	– – – –
familiaris	L	domestic, common, familiar	dog, Canis lupus familiaris	
felis	L	cat	black-footed cat, Felis nigripes; cat flea, Ctenocephalides felis	
felinus	L	cat-like, feline	cat gecko, Aeluroscalabotes felinus; marine otter, Lontra felina	– –
-fer	L	-bearing	western honey bee, Apis mellifera; coconut, Cocos nucifera	
ferox	L	ferocious, wild, bold	long snouted lancetfish, Alepisaurus ferox; fossa, Cryptoprocta ferox	
ferus	L	wild	wild horse, Equus ferus; wild Bactrian camel, Camelus ferus	– –
ferrugo	L	rust	ferruginous swift, Borbo ferruginea; reddish-brown corky spine fungus, Hydnellum ferrugineum; rusty bloodwood, Corymbia ferruginea; rusty parrotfish, Scarus ferrugineus; rusty pitohui, Pseudorectes ferrugineus	– –
fidelis	L	faithful	faithful sea slug, Goniobranchus fidelis; faithful leafcutting bee, Megachile fidelis; Pacific sideband, Monadenia fidelis	
filum	L	thread	desert fan palm, Washingtonia filifera; thread fern, Blechnum filiforme; thread-leaved sundew, Drosera filiformis	– – –
fimbriatus	L	fringed, fibrous	Coomsaharn char, Salvelinus fimbriatus; crested gliding lizard, Draco fimbriatus trumpet cup lichen, Cladonia fimbriata; fringed jumping spider, Portia fimbriata fringed earthstar, Geastrum fimbriatum; gang-gang cockatoo, Callocephalon fimbriatum	– –
flavus	L	golden yellow, light yellow	yellow pitcher plant, Sarracenia flava; yellow-necked mouse, Apodemus flavicollis	– –
floridus	L	flowery	blue palo verde, Parkinsonia florida; floral banded wobbegong, Orectolobus floridus	–
flor-	L flos	flower	southern magnolia, Magnolia grandiflora; great white trillium, Trillium grandiflorum	
fodiens	L fodere	digging	burying beetle, Nicrophorus defodiens; burying beetle, Nicrophorus infodiens; Eurasian water shrew, Neomys fodiens; lowland burrowing tree frog, Smilisca fodiens	
folium	L	leaf	Foliicolous, 'growing on leaves'; American beech, Fagus grandifolia; broad-leaved sermountain, Laserpitium latifolium; Chinese elm, Ulmus parvifolia; Joshua tree, Yucca brevifolia; upright snottygobble, Persoonia longifolia	
formosanus	L fōrmōsānus	from Taiwan (formerly called Formosa)	Formosan black bear, Ursus thibetanus formosanus; Formosan subterranean termite, Coptotermes formosanus Taiwan flower mantis, Acromantis formosana; Taiwanese sweet gum, Liquidambar formosana red quinoa, Chenopodium formosanum; Taiwan saddled carpetshark, Cirrhoscyllium formosanum	– –
formosus	L fōrmōsus	(well-)formed, beautiful	beautiful bronzeback tree snake, Dendrelaphis formosus; Asian arowana, Scleropages formosus Baikal teal, Sibirionetta formosa; least killifish, Heterandria formosa giant maidenhair, Adiantum formosum; beautiful giant-flowered dendrobium, Dendrobium formosum	– –
fragilis	L frangere	breakable	brittle bladder-fern, Cystopteris fragilis; brittle willow, Salix × fragilis; candy cap, Lactarius fragilis; Dientamoeba fragilis; dead man's fingers, Codium fragile; fragile wart frog, Limnonectes fragilis	
fructus	L	fruit	Aspergillus fructus, a fungus species; fructose, fruit sugar; fructicolous, 'growing on fruit'	
fuliginosus	L	sooty	jet black ant, Lasius fuliginosus; ruby tiger, Phragmatobia fuliginosa; sooty hairstreak, Satyrium fuliginosum; sooty milkcap, Lactarius fuliginosus	– –
fulvus	L	deep yellow, tawny	Pacific golden plover, Pluvialis fulva; sulphur leather coral, Rhytisma fulvum; tawny grisette, Amanita fulva; yellow ground squirrel, Spermophilus fulvus	– –
furcatus	L	forked	forked viburnum, Viburnum furcatum; forked wormwood, Artemisia furcata; swallow-tailed gull, Creagrus furcatus	– –
fuscus	L	dark, dark brown	dusky hopping mouse, Notomys fuscus; dusky pitcher-plant, Nepenthes fusca; rusty peat moss, Sphagnum fuscum; sooty tern, Sterna fuscata	– –

== G ==
Latin/Greek	Language	English	Examples	Search for titles containing the word or using the prefix:
gala, galum	G γάλα (gála)	milk	soap plants, Chlorogalum	
garrulus	L	chattering, talkative	Garrulus, a genus of jays; Bohemian waxwing, Bombycilla garrulus Eupithecia garrula, an inchworm moth; chestnut-winged chachalaca, Ortalis garrula Chelostoma garrulum, a carder bee; Omicron garrulum, a potter wasp	– –
gaster, gastro-, gastr-	L gaster G γαστήρ (gastḗr)	belly	common fruit fly, Drosophila melanogaster; Gastropoda	
geo-	G γαῖα, γῆ (gê)	Earth	Conus geographus, geography cone; Geotrichum	
giganteus	L	giant	giganteus (a sea snail); Aldabra giant tortoise, Aldabrachelys gigantea	– –
gigas	G γίγας	giant	Humboldt squid, Dosidicus gigas; snow morel, Gyromitra gigas; cœur de la mer, Entada gigas	
glaber	L glaber	smooth; hairless	naked mole-rat, Heterocephalus glaber; smooth sumac, Rhus glabra; Omphiscola glabra (a snail)	– –
glacialis	L	found in glaciers	North Atlantic right whale, Eubalaena glacialis; glacier wormwood, Artemisia glacialis glacier lantern fish, Benthosema glaciale; Endocellion glaciale, a daisy	–
glandulosus	L	having kernels	Tasmanian laurel, Anopterus glandulosus, Basilan Island caecilian, Ichthyophis glandulosus; honey mesquite, Prosopis glandulosa, warty jumping-slug, Hemphillia glandulosa; skunk currant, Ribes glandulosum,	– –
glaucus	L glaucus G γλαυκός (glaukós)	blue-green, blue-gray, gleaming	silvery blue butterfly, Lepidochrysops glauca; Glaucidae, nudibranch family	– –
glutinosus	L glutinosus	sticky	common alder, Alnus glutinosa; viscid black earth tongue, Glutinoglossum glutinosum; northern slimy salamander, Plethodon glutinosus	– –
glyco-, glycy-, glyc-	G γλυκύς (glukús)	sweet	liquorice, Glycyrrhiza glabra; soybean, Glycine max	
gonatista	G γονατιστα	kneeling	lichen mimic, Gonatista grisea	gonatista
gracilis, gracile	L	slender, graceful	western spotted skunk, Spilogale gracilis; slough darter, Etheostoma gracile; Gracilisuchus	–
gracilipes	L grăcĭlĭpes	slender-footed	slender frog, Austrochaperina gracilipes; slender-legged bushfrog, Gracixalus gracilipes; slenderstalk monkeyflower, Mimulus gracilipes; slimfoot century plant, Agave gracilipes	
graniticus	L	granite	granite claw flower, Calothamnus graniticus; granite poverty bush, Eremophila granitica; granite serpentweed, Tonestus graniticus	– –
graveolens	L gravis	strong-smelling	common rue, Ruta graveolens; lippia, Lippia graveolens	
gregarius	L gregārius, from grex (“flock, herd”)	sociable	sociable lapwing, Vanellus gregarius; goldfish plant, Nematanthus gregarius; desert locust, Schistocerca gregaria; Leptospermum gregarium, an Australian myrtle	– –
griseus	L (a Neo-Latin loanword from Germanic)	grey	desert monitor, Varanus griseus; bluntnose sixgill shark, Hexanchus griseus; parent bug, Elasmucha grisea; lichen mimic, Gonatista grisea paperbark maple, Acer griseum; white-banded house jumping spider, Hypoblemum griseum	– –
groenlandicus	L	from Greenland (Old Norse Grœnland)	harp seal, Pagophilus groenlandicus; spiny lobster, Lebbeus groenlandicus Arctic woolly bear moth, Gynaephora groenlandica; elephanthead lousewort, Pedicularis groenlandica bog Labrador tea, Rhododendron groenlandicum	– –
gyrino-, gyrinus	G γυρῖνος (gurînos)	tadpole	spring salamander, Gyrinophilus porphyriticus; e.g. Crassigyrinus, Proterogyrinus	

== H ==
Latin/Greek	Language	English	Examples	Search for titles containing the word or using the prefix:
haema-, hema-	G αἷμα (haîma)	blood	Haemosporida; Bacteria sp., Haemophilus influenzae, House finch, Haemorhous mexicanus	
hali-, halio-, halo-	G ἅλς (háls)	of the sea, salt	Steller's sea eagle, Haliaeetus pelagicus; grey seal, Halichoerus grypus; black abalone, Haliotis cracherodii	
hamatus	L	hooked	Slender-billed kite, Helicolestes hamatus; Ruitersbos pincushion, Leucospermum hamatum; Dark Tiger (butterfly) Tirumala hamata	– –
haplo-	G ἁπλόος (haplóos)	simple, single	mountain beaver, Aplodontia rufa; Mongolosaurus haplodon	
hedra-	G ἕδρα (hédra)	seat, facet	Chinese ephedra, Ephedra sinica	
helio-	G ἥλιος (hḗlios)	sun	sunflower, Helianthus annuus; sun spurge, Euphorbia helioscopia	
hemisphaerica	G	half-sphere	sand laurel oak, Quercus hemisphaerica, sulphur rose, Rosa hemisphaerica	
hetero-	G	diversely or different	melancholy thistle, Cirsium heterophyllum, Leucanthemum heterophyllum, Smith's cress, Lepidium heterophyllum	
hexa-	G ἕξ (héx)	six	water primrose, Ludwigia hexapetala	
hibernicus	L	from Ireland	Irish whitebeam, Sorbus hibernica; Atlantic ivy, Hedera hibernica; Southern bristetail, Dilta hibernica; Irish hare, Lepus timidus hibernicus; Mycobacterium hiberniae; Pisidium hibernicum	– – –
hibridus	L	hybrid	butterbur, Petasites hybridus, brown spider monkey, Ateles hybridus; kelp goose, Chloephaga hybrida; alsike clover, Trifolium hybridum;	– – – – –
hippo-	G ἵππος (híppos)	horse	seahorse, Hippocampus; lesser horseshoe bat, Rhinolophus hipposideros	
hirsutus	L	hairy	hairy bittercress, Cardamine hirsuta; hairy fruit-eating bat, Artibeus hirsutus; hairy St John's-wort, Hypericum hirsutum	– –
hispidus	L	rough, shaggy, bristly, prickly	banded coral shrimp, Stenopus hispidus; shaggy bracket, Inonotus hispidus ringed seal, Pusa hispida; wax gourd, Benincasa hispida bristly starbur, Acanthospermum hispidum; white butterfly triggerplant, Stylidium hispidum	– –
homo	L	human, man	modern human, Homo sapiens; Neanderthal, Homo neanderthalensis	
hortensis	L hortus	from the garden	broad-leaved anemone, Anemone hortensis; garden orache, Atriplex hortensis; Mexican longwing, Heliconius hortense; Orphean warbler, Sylvia hortensis	–
humilis	L	low, small, humble	Mediterranean dwarf palm, Chamaerops humilis; Talaud flying fox, Acerodon humilis Argentine ant, Linepithema humile; Italian jasmine, Jasminum humile	–
hydro-	G ὕδωρ, ὑδρο- (húdōr, hudro-)	water	Chinese water deer, Hydropotes inermis; capybara, Hydrochoerus hydrochaeris	
hyemalis	L hiems	winter	dark-eyed junco, Junco hyemalis; winter aconite, Eranthis hyemalis rough horsetail, Equisetum hyemale; putty root, Aplectrum hyemale Mucor hiemalis and Hebeloma hiemale, both fungi	– – –
hyper-	G ὑπέρ (hupér)	over, above	St John's wort, Hypericum perforatum	
hyperboreus	G ὑπέρ Βορέᾱ (hupér Boréā)	from the Arctic region (Hyperborea)	glaucous gull, Larus hyperboreus; tundra fleabane, Erigeron hyperboreus tangle or cuvie, Laminaria hyperborea; estuary beggarsticks, Bidens hyperborea boreal bur-reed, Sparganium hyperboreum; boreal haircap moss, Polytrichum hyperboreum	– –
hypo-, hyp-	G ὑπό (hupó)	under, beneath	zebra pleco catfish, Hypancistrus zebra; common cat's-ear, Hypochaeris radicata	

== I–K ==
Latin/Greek	Language	English	Examples	Search for titles containing the word or using the prefix:
iliacus	L	having a distinctive flank	redwing, Turdus iliacus; Etaxalus iliacus, a beetle fox sparrow, Passerella iliaca; Rhytiphora iliaca, a beetle	–
imbricatus	L	tiled	Mountain owl's-clover, Orthocarpus imbricatus	– –
indicus	L	Indian	Malaysian tapir, Tapirus indicus	– –
inaequalis	L	unequal	variable ladybird, Coelophora inaequalis	–
inedulis	L	inedible	fungus, Caloboletus inedulis	–
inermis	L	unarmed, defenceless	water deer, Hydropotes inermis; henna tree, Lawsonia inermis turkey-berry, Canthium inerme; white milkwood, Sideroxylon inerme	–
ingratus	L	offensive	See Ingrata	– –
innotatus	L	unmarked	unmarked dagger moth, Acronicta innotata	
irregularis	L	unusual or irregular	variable burrowing asp, Atractaspis irregularis; viper's bugloss, Hadena irregularis	–
japonicus	L	Japanese	food wrapper plant, Mallotus japonicus; Japanese pagoda tree, Styphnolobium japonicum; Japanese spiraea, Spiraea japonica; see also nipponensis	– –
jubatus	L iubātus	having a mane, crested	cheetah, Acinonyx jubatus; Steller sea lion, Eumetopias jubatus purple pampas grass, Cortaderia jubata; maned forest lizard, Bronchocela jubata foxtail barley, Hordeum jubatum; Piptochaetium jubatum, a speargrass species	– –
kentuckiensis	L	from Kentucky	Kentucky lady's slipper, Cypripedium kentuckiense; Kentucky lichen moth, Cisthene kentuckiensis	–

== L ==
Latin/Greek	Language	English	Examples	Search for titles containing the word or using the prefix:
lact-	L lac	milk, sap, milky white	Chinese peony, Paeonia lactiflora; milk-caps, Lactifluus; Lactophrys; Aspalathus lactea	
laetus	L	pleasant, bright	Crombrugghia laetus, scarce light plume moth; Myoporum laetum, mousehole tree; Parhelophilus laetus	–
laevis	L	smooth	red-eyed assassin bug, Platymeris laevicollis; smooth bedstraw, Cruciata laevipes	
lagus	G λαγώς (lagṓs)	hare	European rabbit, Oryctolagus cuniculus; viscachas, Lagidium spp.	
lancea	L	lance	sculptured seamoth, Pegasus lancifer; swamp lousewort, Pedicularis lanceolata	
lateralis	L	side	black-flanked rock-wallaby, Petrogale lateralis	
lapponicus	L	from Lapland/Sápmi (Neo-Latin Lapponia)	Lapland longspur, Calcarius lapponicus; Lapland mountain sorrel, Rumex lapponicus bar-tailed godwit, Limosa lapponica; pincushion plant, Diapensia lapponica Lapland rosebay, Rhododendron lapponicum; Lapland poppy, Papaver lapponicum	– –
latus	L	flank; broad	horse-eye jack, Caranx latus; wideleaf waterparsnip, Sium latifolium; wych elm, Ulmus glabra 'Latifolia Aurea'	
laxus	L	wide, yielding	American globeflower, Trollius laxus; Cyperus laxus, a sedge flowering grass, Freesia laxa; tufted forget-me-not, Myosotis laxa Bredasdorp conebush, Leucadendron laxum; false lily turf, Chlorophytum laxum	– –
lepidus	L	pleasant, pleasing, charming	rock rattlesnake, Crotalus lepidus; ocellated lizard, Timon lepidus desert woodrat, Neotoma lepida; embossed hawthorn buprestid, Dicerca lepida greenthroat darter, Etheostoma lepidum; Leccinellum lepidum, a bolete	– –
lepis, lepido-	G λεπίς (lepís)	scale, rind, husk, flake	large-scale mullet, Liza macrolepis; Lepidoptera	
lepto-, lepti-	G λεπτός (leptós)	light	Leptictidium auderiense, Leptospira kirschneri	
lepus	L	hare	black-tailed jackrabbit, Lepus californicus	
leuco-, leuc-	G λευκός (leukós)	white	white-winged tern, Chlidonias leucopterus	
leucocephalus	G	white-headed	bald eagle, Haliaeetus leucocephalus; white-crowned pigeon, Patagioenas leucocephala; white-headed marsh tyrant, Arundinicola leucocephala; white-headed stilt, Himantopus leucocephalus; also see albiceps	– –
leucodon	G	white-toothed	bicolored shrew, Crocidura leucodon; lesser mole-rat, Spalax leucodon; white-toothed cowry, Cypraea leucodon; white-toothed woodrat, Neotoma leucodon; also see albidens	
leucurus	G	white-tailed	white-tailed ptarmigan, Lagopus leucura; white-tailed robin, Cinclidium leucurum; white-tailed stonechat, Saxicola leucurus	– –
lignum	L	wood	Guaiacum, lignum-vitae; Vitex lignum-vitae, yellow hollywood tree; lignicolous, 'growing on wood'; Lignum nephriticum	
limno-	G λίμνη (límnē)	lake, pond	Limnobacter, bacteria; Limnodynastidae, Australian ground frogs	
limosus	L	muddy	limosa harlequin frog, Atelopus limosus; mud amnicola, Amnicola limosus	– –
lineatus	L	lined or striped	thirteen-lined ground squirrel, Ictidomys tridecemlineatus; Colorado potato beetle, Leptinotarsa decemlineata	
lobos	L lobus G λοβός (lobós)	lobe	three-lobe buttercup, Ranunculus trilobus	
longi-	L longus	long	frog shark, Somniosus longus, galingale, Cyperus longus; Turmeric, Curcuma longa; Long pepper, Piper longum,	– – –
longicaudatus	L	long-tailed	long-tailed pygmy rice rat, Oligoryzomys longicaudatus; longtail catfish, Olyra longicaudata; longtail tadpole shrimp Triops longicaudatus	– –
longicollis	L	long-necked	eastern long-necked turtle, Chelodina longicollis	–
longifolius	L	long-leaved	long-leaf persoonia, Persoonia longifolia; long-leaf wild buckwheat, Eriogonum longifolium; long-leaved butterwort, Pinguicula longifolia; longleaf bush lupine, Lupinus longifolius; longleaf sunflower, Helianthus longifolius	– –
longirostris	L	long beak	longbeak buttercup, Ranunculus longirostris; longsnout blacksmelt, Dolicholagus longirostris	–
luctuosus	L	sorrowful, mournful	forget-me-not bug, Sehirus luctuosus; white-shouldered tanager, Tachyphonus luctuosus; four-spotted moth, Tyta luctuosa	– –
luminosus	L	glowing	cucubano, Ignelater luminuosus; New Zealand glowworm, Arachnocampa luminosa; striped flying squid, Eucleoteuthis luminosa	– –
lupus, lupo-	L	(resembling a) wolf	grey wolf, Canis lupus; wolf blenny, Omox lupus; headwater catfish, Ictalurus lupus; wolfsnout goby, Luposicya lupus	
luteus	L	yellow, saffron-colored	yellow mariposa lily, Calochortus luteus; yellow vetch, Vicia lutea; red-billed leiothrix, Leiothrix lutea	– –

== M ==
Latin/Greek	Language	English	Examples	Search for titles containing the word or using the prefix:
macro-	G μακρός (makrós)	long, large	big-headed mole rat, Tachyoryctes macrocephalus; rock onion, Allium macrum; sea snail, Turbonilla macra	–
macroura	G	long-tailed	hooded skunk, Mephitis macroura	
maculatus	L	spotted	tiger quoll, Dasyurus maculatus; spotted sandpiper, Actitis macularius	– –
madagascariensis	L	from Madagascar	Madagascar day gecko, Phelsuma madagascariensis madagascariensis; Malagasy ground boa, Acrantophis madagascariensis; Malagasy tree boa, Sanzinia madagascariensis; Madagascar fruit-bat argasid, Ornithodoros madagascariensis	
magnus	L	great, large	streaked spiderhunter, Arachnothera magna	– –
major	L	greater	great tit, Parus major	
malabaricus	L	from Malabar	chestnut-tailed starling, Sturnia malabaricus	
marginatus	L	bordered	gold edge Japanese euonymus, Euonymus japonicus 'Aureomarginatus' ; marginated tortoise, Testudo marginata	– –
maritima	L	of the sea	sea beet, Beta vulgaris subsp. maritima; samphire, Crithmum maritimum, sea holly, Eryngium maritimum; polar bear, Ursus maritimus, sea rush, Juncus maritimus,	– –
mauretanicus	L	from Mauretania (the Maghreb, northwest Africa)	Balearic shearwater, Puffinus mauretanicus; Moroccan hairstreak, Tomares mauretanicus Adscita mauretanica, a moth; Marginella mauretanica, a sea snail	– –
mauro-	G μαυρός (maurós)	dark, black	dark shrew, Crocidura maurisca	
maximus	L	largest	royal tern, Thalasseus maximus	
mega-	G μέγας (mégas)	large, great	megalodon shark, Otodus megalodon	
megacephalus	G	big-headed	Andriyashev large-headed sculpin, Andriashevicottus megacephalus; big-head rush, Juncus megacephalus; big-headed ant, Pheidole megacephala; big-headed tiger beetle, Megacephala megacephala; coastal plain hawkweed, Hieracium megacephalum; large-headed rice rat, Hylaeamys megacephalus	– –
mel	L	honey	black sage, Salvia mellifera; Nephelium melliferum; western honey bee, Apis mellifera	
melano-	G μελανός (melanós)	black	black-browed albatross, Thalassarche melanophris	–
melanocephalus	G	black-headed	black-headed fleabane, Erigeron melanocephalus; black-headed snake, Tantilla melanocephala; ghost ant, Tapinoma melanocephalum	– –
melanophyllus	G	black-leaved	Melanophylla; Melanophyllum	– –
melanops	G	black-eyed, black-faced	black-eyed blue, Glaucopsyche melanops; black-fronted dotterel, Elseyornis melanops; gray spiny mouse, Scolomys melanops	
mephitis	L	bad odor	striped skunk, Mephitis mephitis; yellow-pigmented bacteria, Luteimonas mephitis	
meridionalis	L	southern	southern oak bush cricket, Meconema meridionale; Andean blueberry, Vaccinium meridionale southern mammoth, Mammuthus meridionalis; Zimbabwe grey baboon tarantula, Ceratogyrus meridionalis	–
micro-	G μικρός (mikrós)	small	littleleaf pussytoes, Antennaria microphylla	
microphyllus	G	small-leaved	baby sage, Salvia microphylla; boxleaf azara, Azara microphylla; littleleaf box, Buxus microphylla; littleleaf mock-orange, Philadelphus microphyllus; small-leaf climbing fern, Lygodium microphyllum	– –
minimus	L	smallest	least flycatcher, Empidonax minimus	
minor	L	smaller	great frigatebird, Fregata minor	
minuta	L	small	dwarf waterclover, Marsilea minuta, little cuckoo, Coccycua minuta; little gull, Hydrocoloeus minutus, harvest mouse, Micromys minutus; little willowherb, Epilobium minutum,	– –
mitra	LG	headband, turban or mitre	Mitra spp., mitre shells; Gyromitra esculenta, false morel; Psittacara mitratus, mitred conure; Presbytis mitrata, mitered langur	– – –
monile	L	necklace	Conus monilifer	
mono-	G μόνος (mónos)	single	Swinhoe's storm-petrel, Oceanodroma monorhis; Monotreme	
monoica	L	monoicous	the sandpaper saucer-berry, Cordia monoica	
monospermus	L	Having a single sperm cell	one-seed juniper Juniperus monosperma	– –
monspeliensis	L	from Montpellier	Montpellier cistus, Cistus monspeliensis	– – –
montanus	L mons	of the mountains	mountain bottlebrush, Melaleuca montana; mountain mahogany, Cercocarpus montanus; mountain thistle, Acanthus montanus; tree sparrow, Passer montanus	
morpho-	G μορφή (morphḗ)	shape	Menelaus blue morpho, Morpho menelaus	
mus, mys	L mūs G μῦς (mûs)	mouse	house mouse, Mus musculus; as rodent, e.g. Phoberomys, Telicomys	
mulgere	G	to milk	European nightjar, Caprimulgus europaeus	Caprimulgus
muralis	L	growing on the wall	annual wall-rocket Diplotaxis muralis, Psammophiliella muralis	

== N ==
Latin/Greek	Language	English	Examples	Search for titles containing the word or using the prefix:
naevius	L	having moles or spots	varied thrush, Ixoreus naevius; spotted salamander, Hynobius naevius striped cuckoo, Tapera naevia; common grasshopper warbler, Locustella naevia spotted oncidium, Oncidium naevium; Cyrtidium naevium, a fungus	– –
nanos	G νᾶνος (nânos) L nanus	dwarf	brown-capped woodpecker, Dendrocopos nanus; dwarf birch, Betula nana; dwarf shrew, Sorex nanus; Nanotyrannus	
natans	L	floating	Water caltrop, Trapa natans	
neomexicanus	L	from New Mexico	New Mexico whiptail, Aspidoscelis neomexicanus; New Mexican yucca, Yucca neomexicana; New Mexico thistle, Cirsium neomexicanum	– –
naevius	L	having moles or spots	varied thrush, Ixoreus naevius; spotted salamander, Hynobius naevius striped cuckoo, Tapera naevia; common grasshopper warbler, Locustella naevia spotted oncidium, Oncidium naevium; Cyrtidium naevium, a fungus	– –
nexus	L	tied, bound	Eschmeyer nexus, a fish Phragmatiphila nexa, a moth	– –
nippon(ensis)	L	from Japan (natively known as Nippon)	freshwater shrimp, Macrobrachium nipponense; Japanese bobtail squid, Sepiolina nipponensis; Sika deer, Cervus nippon; Crested ibis, Nipponia nippon See also: japonicus	– –
nitidus	L nitere	shining	Baja cape kingsnake, Lampropeltis getula nitida; Mauritius blue pigeon, Alectroenas nitidissima; shining pea clam, Pisidium nitidum; shining tree iguana, Liolaemus nitidus	– –
nix	L	snow	snow buckwheat, Eriogonum niveum; snow bunting, Plectrophenax nivalis; snow petrel, Pagodroma nivea; snow sheep Ovis nivicola; snowy plover, Charadrius nivosus; snowy primrose, Primula nivalis; snowy sunflower, Helianthus niveus;	– – – –
nonus	L	ninth	honey fungus, Armillaria nabsnona	
norvegicus	L	from Norway	Norway lobster, Nephrops norvegicus; brown rat, Rattus norvegicus; rose fish, Sebastes norvegicus; Northern krill, Meganyctiphanes norvegica; highland cudweed, Gnaphalium norvegicum;	– –
nothos	G νόθος (nóthos) L nothus	false, wrong	bluefin notho killifish, Nothobranchius rachovii; New Zealand red beech, Nothofagus fusca	
noton	G νῶτον (nôton)	back	black-backed antshrike, Thamnophilus melanonotus	
notos	G νότος (nótos)	southern	fawn hopping mouse, Notomys cervinus	
novaeangliae	L	from New England	humpback whale, Megaptera novaeangliae; Sphaerophoria novaeangliae, a syrphid fly New England boneset, Eupatorium novae-angliae; New England aster, Symphyotrichum novae-angliae	–
novaehollandiae	L	from New Holland (Australia)	emu, Dromaius novaehollandiae; New Holland rattlepod, Crotalaria novae-hollandiae; Sepia novaehollandiae, a cuttlefish	–
novaeseelandiae	L	from New Zealand	southern boobook, Ninox novaeseelandiae New Zealand scallop, Pecten novaezelandiae yellow-dabbled flounder, Brachypleura novaezeelandiae New Zealand horned orchid, Orthoceras novae-zeelandiae red bidibid, Acaena novae-zelandiae	– – – –
noveboracensis	L	from New York (Novum Eboracum)	margined carrion beetle, Oiceoptoma noveboracense; New York fern, Thelypteris noveboracensis; northern waterthrush, Seiurus noveboracensis	–
novem	L	nine	nine-banded armadillo, Dasypus novemcinctus; nine-spotted lady beetle, Coccinella novemnotata	
nucifera	L	bearing nuts	butter-nut of Guiana, Caryocar nuciferum; coconut, Cocos nucifera	
nutans	L	nodding	nodding madia, Harmonia nutans; nodding spurge, Euphorbia nutans	

== O ==
Latin/Greek	Language	English	Example	Search for titles containing the word or using the prefix:
obscurus	L	dark	dark bolo mouse, Necromys obscurus; dusky dolphin, Lagenorhynchus obscurus; obscure morning glory, Ipomoea obscura; rare clubmoss, Lycopodium obscurum	– –
obsoletus	L	obsolete, degenerate	Pantherophis obsoletus; Great Plains skink, Plestiodon obsoletus	–
occidentalis	L	western	eastern arborvitae, Thuja occidentalis; western clover, Trifolium occidentale	–
ocean	G ὠκεανός (ōkeanós)	ocean	oceanic gecko, Gehyra oceanica; Mediterranean tapeweed, Posidonia oceanica	–
octo-, octa-	G ὀκτω- ὀκτα-	eight	common octopus, Octopus vulgaris	
-odon, -odus	G ὀδών (odṓn), ὀδούς (odoús)	tooth	Dimetrodon, Rhizodus	
oeso-	G οἰσέμεν (oisémen), οἰσ-	carry	Oesophagostomum	
officinalis	L	for the workshop; medicinal	ginger, Zingiber officinale; rosemary, Rosmarinus officinalis	–
oleraceus	L	used as a vegetable	cabbage, broccoli, kale, Brussels sprouts, and so on, Brassica oleracea; common sowthistle, Sonchus oleraceus	– –
oleum, olearis	L	oil	Omphalotus olearius, jack o'lantern mushroom	
ommato-	G ὄμμᾰ (ómma), gen. ὄμμᾰτος (ómmatos)	eye	Ommatokoita, Ommatochila, Ommatospila	
ophis	G ὄφις (óphis)	serpent	Carphophis vermis, western wormsnake	
ophrys	G ὀφρύς (ophrús)	eyebrow	bee orchid, Ophrys; Central American bushmaster, Lachesis stenophrys Melanophrys, fly genus; Cyanophrys, butterfly genus	
-ophthalmus	G ὀφθαλμός (ophthalmós)	eye	common rudd, Scardinius erythrophthalmus; Ariosoma ophidiophthalmus, an eel; Spanish ling, Molva macrophthalma; Hippopsicon macrophthalmum, a beetle; Cyprinion microphthalmum, a fish; gold-eye lichen, Teloschistes chrysophthalmus	
ops	G ὤψ (ṓps)	face, eye	Triceratops	
-opsis	G ὄψις (ópsis)	resembling	Carolina parakeet, Conuropsis carolinensis	
orientalis	L	eastern	Oriental cockroach, Blatta orientalis	–
ortho-	G ὀρθός (orthós)	straight	Orthoptera	
oryza	G ὄρυζα (óruza)	rice	Asian rice, Oryza sativa; rice rats, Oryzomys	
ovatus	L	egg-shaped	shagbark hickory, Carya ovata	– –

== P ==
Latin/Greek	Language	English	Examples	Search for titles containing the word or using the prefix:
pachy-	G παχύς (pakhús)	thick, stout	Pachycephalosaurus, Pachypodium	
palaemon	G Παλαίμων (Palaímōn)	Palaemon, a sea god whose name means "wrestler"	Palaemon, crustacean genus; chequered skipper, Carterocephalus palaemon Palaemonias, Palaemonella and Palaemonetes, shrimp genera	
pallidus	L	pale	Dalmatian iris, Iris pallida	– –
palustris	L paluster	of the marsh	mugger crocodile, Crocodylus palustris; marsh marigold, Caltha palustris; Sphagnurus paluster, mushroom;	– – –
pan- panto-	G πᾶν (pân)	all	Pancratium (a flower); Pangaea	
paradoxus	L, from G παράδοξος (parádoxos)	contrary to expectation, strange, uncharacteristic	Pallas's sandgrouse, Syrrhaptes paradoxus, puzzle sunflower, Helianthus paradoxus ghost mantis, Phyllocrania paradoxa, paradoxical frog, Pseudis paradoxa green-banded broodsac, Leucochloridium paradoxum, few-flowered garlic, Allium paradoxum	– –
parilis	L	equal	Syngrapha parilis, a moth; Metasphenisca parilis, a fruit fly Nephroma parile, a fungus; Malmesbury pincushion, Leucospermum parile	–
parviflorus	L	small-flowered	small-flowered mallow, Malva parviflora; thimbleberry, Rubus parviflorus	– –
parvifolius	L	small-leaved	Chinese elm, Ulmus parvifolia; littleleaf ceanothus, Ceanothus parvifolius; small-leaved lomatium, Lomatium parvifolium	– –
parvus	L	small	dwarf catshark, Asymbolus parvus; mountain pygmy possum, Burramys parvus; small onion, Allium parvum	–
pecten	L	comb	Venus comb murex, Murex pecten	
ped	L pēs	foot	showy lady slipper, Cypripedium reginae	
pelagicus	L, G πελαγικός	of the open sea	pelagic cormorant, Phalacrocorax pelagicus	– –
penn-	L penna	feather, wing	Darwin's rhea, Rhea pennata; great auk, Pinguinus impennis	
penta-	G πέντε (pénte)	five	five-fingered skink, Chalcides pentadactylus	
pes-caprae	L pēs, L caprae	goat's foot	Beach morning glory, Ipomoea pes-caprae	
petro-	G πέτρα (pétra), L petra	rock, stone	Roberts's flat-headed bat, Sauromys petrophilus; rock daisy, Erigeron petrophilus	
phago-	G ἔφαγον	eat	African scat (fish), Scatophagus tetracanthus; Icthyophaga, the ("fish-eating") sea eagle	
phalloides	G	like a phallus	Amanita phalloides, the death cap, a poisonous basidiomycete fungus species	
phenolicus	L	able to degrade phenol	Pseudoalteromonas phenolica	– –
philippinensis	L	from the Philippines	katmon tree, Dillenia philippinensis; Philippine cobra, Naja philippinensis	
pholis	G φολῐ́ς (pholís)	horny scale	bluespotted grouper, Cephalopholis argus	
phyllo-	G φύλλον (phúllon)	leaf	garden lupin, Lupinus polyphyllus	
physi-	G φύσις (phúsis)	nature	Symphysia ("naturally joined") (a plant)	
phyto-	G φυτόν (phutón)	plant	Astrophytum, Astrophytum myriostigma (a cactus); epiphyte	
pictus	L	painted	Pimelodus pictus, a catfish; painted skipper, Hesperilla picta; painted tunicate, Clavelina picta; Abutilon pictum, a shrub	– –
platy-	G πλατύς (platús)	flat and broad	flathead trout, Salmo platycephalus; platypus	
pleio-	G	larger, greater in quantity	Pleiogynium timoriense, Burdekin plum, sweet plum, tulip plum; pleiotropy, (a gene) exhibiting multiple phenotypic expression	
plicatilis	L	flexible, pliable	fan-aloe, Kumara plicatilis; lobed river mullet, Cestraeus plicatilis Dendrobium plicatile, an orchid; Cormohipparion plicatile, an extinct horse	–
plumosum	L	feathered	big tarweed, Blepharizonia plumosa; buzzer midge, Chironomus plumosus	– –
pod-	G πούς (poús)	foot, leg, stem	red-footed spikesedge, Eleocharis erythropoda; Arthropoda; Gastropoda	
poliocephalus	G	grey-headed	ashy-headed goose, Chloephaga poliocephala; grey-crowned flatbill, Tolmomyias poliocephalus; grey-headed flying fox, Pteropus poliocephalus; grey-headed goshawk, Accipiter poliocephalus; hoary-headed grebe, Poliocephalus poliocephalus; white-headed langur, Trachypithecus poliocephalus; yellow-lored tody-flycatcher, Todirostrum poliocephalum	– –
poly-	G πολύς (polús)	many, much	common knotgrass, Polygonum aviculare	
pomum	L	fruit	apple maggot, Rhagoletis pomonella; apple murex, Phyllonotus pomum; codling moth, Cydia pomonella; emu apple, Kunzea pomifera; Osage orange, Maclura pomifera	– – –
ponticus	G Πόντος (Póntos)	Pontic; from Pontus, Turkey	Black Sea field mouse, Apodemus ponticus; Pontic adder, Vipera pontica; Pontic rhododendron, Rhododendron ponticum; Roman wormwood, Artemisia pontica	– –
praecox	L	early	early onion, Allium praecox; neon rainbow, Melanotaenia praecox; wintersweet, Chimonanthus praecox	
praestans	L	excelling	Kamchatka bilberry, Vaccinium praestans; goliath webcap mushroom, Cortinarius praestans; (a butterfly), Ypthima praestans; (a ground beetle), Lesticus praestans; Tulipa praestans	
praeustus	L	burned at the end, scorched, withered	brownback trevally, Carangoides praeustus; Adetus praeustus, a beetle Serixia praeusta, a beetle; Tricholauxania praeusta, a fly; Trogoxylon praeustum, a beetle	– –
prātum	L	meadow	Inyo meadow lupine, Lupinus pratensis; meadow foxtail, Alopecurus pratensis; meadow sedge, Carex praticola; meadow waxcap, Cuphophyllus pratensis	– –
princeps	L	first, leader, principal, princely	Korean wormwood, Artemisia princeps; princely spiny-tailed lizard, Uromastyx princeps; American pika, Ochotona princeps	
proto-	G πρῶτος (prôtos)	first	Protozoa	
pruinosus	L	pruinose, "frosted", covered in white granules	Tibetan blue bear, Ursus arctos pruinosus; frosted myotis, Myotis pruinosus fuzzywuzzy airplant, Tillandsia pruinosa; frosted hawthorn, Crataegus pruinosa crimson-tailed marsh hawk, Orthetrum pruinosum; dotted blue-eyed grass, Sisyrinchium pruinosum	– –
prunicolor	L	plum-colored	plum-colored worm lizard, Amphisbaena prunicolor	
pruriens	L	itching	velvet bean, Mucuna pruriens	
pseudo-	L G ψευδής (pseudḗs)	false or fake	Brazilian false rice rat, Pseudoryzomys simplex; pastel flower, Pseuderanthemum variabile	
psych-	G ψυχή (psychḗ)	mind, soul	psychedelic	
psychrophilus	G ψυχρός (psukhrós)	cold-loving	bacterial rod, Flavobacterium psychrophilum; bacterium, Geobacter psychrophilus; whip-lash squid, Mastigoteuthis psychrophila	– –
pterus, -pter	G πτερόν (pterón)	wing, feather	white-winged tern, Chlidonias leucopterus; Pteranodon (winged toothless); Pterodactylus (winged finger); Pteridophyta; Diptera; Coleoptera Pterocarya	
ptyo-	G πτύον (ptyon)	fan	fan-fingered geckos, Ptyodactylus; crag martin, Ptyonoprogne	
puberulus	L	having short, soft hairs	Hydroporus puberulus, a diving beetle; Leptomyrmex puberulus, an ant mountain bellwort, Uvularia puberula; hairy melicope, Melicope puberula plains flax, Linum puberulum; red berry stick plant, Teucrium puberulum	– –
pubescens	L	downy	downy oak, Quercus pubescens	
pugil	L pugil	a boxer	fighting conch, Strombus pugilis	
pulchellus	L	pretty little	beautiful sunbird, Cinnyris pulchella; green pygmy goose, Nettapus pulchellus	– –
pumilus	L	dwarf	Cape dwarf chameleon, Bradypodion pumilum; dwarf cuckoo, Coccycua pumila; dwarf mouse-ear, Cerastium pumilum; eastern forest bat, Vespadelus pumilus; shaggy fleabane, Erigeron pumilus; Siberian elm, Ulmus pumila	– –
punctatus	L	spotted, marked with punctures	dotted thyme-moss, Rhizomnium punctatum; thirteen-spotted lady beetle, Hippodamia tredecimpunctata	– –
pungens	L pungens	pungent	blue spruce, Picea pungens; pungent slippery jack, Suillus pungens	
purpurascens	L	somewhat purple	veiled purple hygrophorus, Hygrophorus purpurascens	
purpureus	L purpureus	purple	purple amole, Chlorogalum purpureum; purple coneflower, Echinacea purpurea; purple finch, Haemorhous purpureus	– –
pygmaeus	L, from the Pygmaeī	pygmy, dwarf	Bornean orangutan, Pongo pygmaeus; pygmy three-toed sloth, Bradypus pygmaeus; Western Greece goby, Economidichthys pygmaeus; western pygmy marmoset, Cebuella pygmaea; smooth spike-primrose, Epilobium pygmaeum; alpine glacier poppy, Papaver pygmaeum	– –
pygargus	G πῡ́γᾰργος (pū́gargos)	white-rumped	Montagu's harrier, Circus pygargus	
pygo-	G πυγή (pugḗ)	tail, rump	chinstrap penguin, Pygoscelis antarcticus	

== Q ==
Latin/Greek	Language	English	Example	Search for titles containing the word or using the prefix:
quadri-	L quattuor	four, square	burr grass, Festuca quadriflora (four-flowered); four-coloured bushshrike, Telophorus quadricolor; fourspot butterflyfish, Chaetodon quadrimaculatus; whorled loosestrife, Lysimachia quadrifolia (four-leaved)	

== R ==
Latin/Greek	Language	English	Examples	Search for titles containing the word or using the prefix:
radix	L	root or radish	taproot fleabane, Erigeron radicatus	– – –
rāmus	L	branch	branched draba, Draba ramosissima; branched murex, Chicoreus ramosus	– –
regalis	L	royal	Synalpheus regalis; regal moth, Citheronia regalis; royal lily, Lilium regale	–
repandus	L repandus	curved upwards, turned up	dragon's tongue, Hemigraphis repanda; hedgehog mushroom, Hydnum repandum; Peruvian apple cactus, Cereus repandus	– –
repens	L	creeping, crawling (rēpēns)	creeping buttercup, Ranunculus repens, white clover, Trifolium repens	
repens	L	unexpected (rĕpēns)	Eyres skink, Oligosoma repens	
reptans, rept-	L	creeping, crawling	bugle, Ajuga reptans; creeping cinquefoil, Potentilla reptans; Reptilia	
reticulata	L	reticulated (having the form of a grid or network)	mandarin orange, Citrus reticulata	– –
rhino-	G ῥίς (rhís)	nose	orange leaf-nosed bat, Rhinonicteris aurantia; rhinoceros	
rhiza	G ῥίζα (rhíza)	root	bushy seedbox, Ludwigia helminthorrhiza; Rhizobium (nitrogen-fixing soil bacteria)	
rhodo-	G ῥόδον (rhódon)	rose, rose-colored	Rhododendron Butter Cap, Rhodocollybia butyracea	
rhynchos	G ῥύγχος (rhúnkhos)	beak or snout	mallard, Anas platyrhynchos; Rhamphorhynchus	
rhytis	G ῥῠτίς (rhutís)	wrinkled, folded	shaggy moss, Rhytidiadelphus triquetrus; Rhytidodon (syn. Rutiodon)	
rigidus	L	rigid, stiff	big galleta, Hilaria rigida	– –
rossicus	L	from Russia	Pliosaurus rossicus	
rostr-	L rōstrum	beak, bill, snout	common crossbill, Loxia curvirostra	
rostralis	L	with a beak	buttoned snout moth, Hypena rostralis	–
rostratus	L rōstrātus	having a beak	beaked sedge, Carex rostrata; beaked yucca, Yucca rostrata; Caribbean sharp-nose puffer, Canthigaster rostrata; longnose surgeonfish, Zebrasoma rostratum	– –
ruber, rubr-	L ruber	red	red maple, Acer rubrum; red valerian, Centranthus ruber; ruby bolete, Hortiboletus rubellus; summer tanager, Piranga rubra	– – – –
ruder-	L rūdus, rūderis	rubbish	Cannabis ruderalis; Porophyllum ruderale; ruderal bumblebee, Bombus ruderatus	– –
rudis, rud-	L	rough, rude	coarse chameleon, Trioceros rudis; pied kingfisher Ceryle rudis; rough gecko, Naultinus rudis; rough mabuya, Eutropis rudis	–
rufus, ruf-	L	red, reddish	red wolf, Canis rufus; rufous rubber cup, Galiella rufa	– – –
rupestris	L	living on cliffs or rocks	Eurasian crag martin, Ptyonoprogne rupestris; rock bass, Ambloplites rupestris rock campion, Atocion rupestre; alpine tea-tree, Leptospermum rupestre	–
rupicola	L	cliff dweller	Diplacus rupicola, Death Valley monkeyflower; Narcissus rupicola; Tabernaemontana rupicola	
russus	L	reddish	Lophocampa russus, a moth; Toxitiades russus, a beetle; Schistura russa, a stone loach; Steccherinum russum, a fungus	– –
russulus	L	little reddish one	greater white-toothed shrew, Crocidura russula; Mimeresia russulus, a butterfly; pinkmottle woodwax, Hygrophorus russula; Bryum russulum, a moss	– –

== S ==
Latin/Greek	Language	English	Examples	Search for titles containing the word or using the prefix:
sanctus	L	sacred	See sanctus (species)	
sanguis	L	blood	bloodroot, Sanguinaria canadensis	
sapiens	L	wise	recent subspecies of humans: Homo sapiens sapiens ("wise wise man")	
saponaria	L	soapy	soapworts (Saponaria spp.), soapbark (Quillaja saponaria), Ramaria flavosaponaria	
sativus	L	sown, cultivated	oat, Avena sativa; pea, Pisum sativum; rice, Oryza sativa	– –
saura, -saur	G σαῦρος (saûros)	lizard, reptile	lancetfish, Alepisaurus; Maiasaura (dinosaur)	
saxum	L	rock	saxicolous, 'growing on rocks/stones'; common rock thrush, Monticola saxatilis; Saxicola, stonechats; Saxifraga, rockfoils; Saxifragaceae, herbaceous plant family	
scriptus	L	written, scribbled, scrawled	Cape bushbuck, Tragelaphus scriptus; scrawled filefish, Aluterus scriptus pond slider, Trachemys scripta; long hoverfly, Sphaerophoria scripta; Grammatophyllum scriptum, an orchid; Steindachneridion scriptum, a catfish	– –
sculptus	L	sculpted	reed-stemmed orchid, Epidendrum sculptum; sculpted lanternshark, Etmopterus sculptus; sculpted puffball, Calvatia sculpta	– –
septem	L	seven	seven-spot ladybird, Coccinella septempunctata	
septentrionalis	L	Northern Hemisphere (septentrional, "of the seven plough-oxen", a reference to The Plough)	northern rockling, Ciliata septentrionalis northern spleenwort, Asplenium septentrionale	–
setosus	L	bristly or shaggy	hairy Atlantic spiny rat, Trinomys setosus; arctic iris Iris setosa, Diadema setosum	– –
sidero-	G σίδηρος (sídēros)	iron	Siderostigma, Sideroxylon; lesser horseshoe bat, Rhinolophus hipposideros	
silvestris, sylvestris silvaticus	L	from woodland or forest; wild	wildcat, Felis silvestris; snowdrop anemone, Anemone sylvestris; Wood frog, Lithobates sylvaticus	, –, –,
similis	L	similar	Callinectes similis	–
simplex	L	simple	see List of species named simplex	
sinensis	L	from China	tea, Camellia sinensis	–
smaragdinus	G σμάραγδος (smáragdos)	emerald	green grass lizard, Takydromus smaragdinus; Carabus smaragdinus, a beetle Smaragdina, beetle genus; Asian weaver ant, Oecophylla smaragdina Epidendrum smaragdinum, an orchid; Smaragdia, snail genus	– – –
speciosus	L	showy	queen's crape-myrtle, Lagerstroemia speciosa; Japanese lily, Lilium speciosum	– –
sperma	G σπέρμα (spérma)	seed	African daisies, Osteospermum	
sphen-, spheno-	G σφήν (sphḗn)	wedge	tuatara, Sphenodon punctatus	
squamatus	L	with scales	scaly francolin, Pternistis squamatus, scaled woodcreeper, Lepidocolaptes squamatus	
stellatus	L	starry	carrageenan moss, Mastocarpus stellatus; Red-throated loon, Gavia stellata autumn onion, Allium stellatum	– –
stichus, sticticus	G στίχος (stíkhos)	line, file	Ochlerotatus sticticus, a mosquito; western erete, Eretes sticticus Acalolepta stictica, a beetle; Punctelia stictica, a lichen Trypetisoma sticticum, a fly; Diorygma sticticum, a lichen Toothfish, Dissostichus	– –
stoma	G στόμα (stóma)	mouth, opening	stomate, Gnathostomata	
striatus	L	striped	African striped skink, Trachylepis striata; striated heron, Butorides striatus; striped Barbados lily, Hippeastrum striatum	– –
strictus	L	straight, narrow, erect	chocolate lily, Dichopogon strictus; Oxalis stricta; Babiana stricta; Nardus stricta, bog haircap moss, Polytrichum strictum	– –
strix, strig-	L or G	owl	kākāpō or owl parrot, Strigops habroptilus; tawny frogmouth, Podargus strigoides; tawny owl, Strix aluco	
suber	L	cork	cork oak, Quercus suber	
suchos, -suchus	G σοῦχος (soûkhos)	crocodile (from Egyptian)	Eusuchia; Koolasuchus	
sulcatus	L	furrowed	furrowed wakerobin, Trillium sulcatum; grooved helmet-orchid, Nematoceras sulcatum	– –
symbio	G συμβίωσις (sumbíōsis)	symbiosis	Symbiodinium; Symbiontida	
syriacus	L	Syrian	common milkweed, Asclepias syriacus	– –

== T ==
Latin/Greek	Language	English	Examples	Search for titles containing the word or using the prefix:
taenia	G ταινία (tainía)	ribbon, tape	pork tapeworm, Taenia solium	
tardus, tardi-	L	slow, late	great bustard, Otis tarda; Chisos Mountains oak, Quercus tardifolia	
tele-, tel-	G τῆλε (têle)	far, distant	New South Wales waratah, Telopea speciosissima	
tenax	L	clinging, tenacious	bear grass, Xerophyllum tenax; tough bully, Sideroxylon tenax; tough-leaved iris, Iris tenax	
tenuis	L	thin, slender, fine	slender rush, Juncus tenuis; plealeaf knotweed, Polygonum tenue	–
terrestris, terrestre	L	terrestrial	large earth bumblebee, Bombus terrestris bent orchid, Geodorum terrestre	–
tetra-	G τετρα-	four	four-leaved allseed, Polycarpon tetraphyllum; Tetrapoda	
therium, ther-	G θηρίον (thēríon), θήρ (thḗr)	beast, wild animal	giant ground sloth, Megatherium americanum; stinkpot turtle, Sternotherus odoratus; gelada, Theropithecus gelada	
timidus	L	shy, timid	Mountain hare, Lepus timidus; Rhene timidus, a jumping spider; dwarf three-toed slider, Lerista timida; Elysia timida, a sea slug; Zodarion timidum, an ant spider	– –
tinctorius	L	for dyeing	woad, Isatis tinctoria	– –
tolyp-	G τολυπη (tolypē)	ball of wool, lump	Tolyposporium, mushroom genus; Tolypanthus, plant genus; Tolypella, algae genus	
tomentosus	L	furry	bristle-tail filefish, Acreichthys tomentosus; fuzzy mock-orange, Philadelphus tomentosus; woollyleaf ceanothus, Ceanothus tomentosus	– –
tortus	L	twisted	Didymoceras tortus, an extinct ammonite corkscrew beggarticks, Bidens torta; Fusiturris torta, a sea snail Bulbophyllum tortum, an orchid; Chloroleucon tortum, a plant	– –
trachy-	G τραχύς (trachys)	rough	Trachyscorpia, fish genus; Trachyaretaon, insect genus	
tri-, tris-	L tri-, G τρι- (tri-)	three	black-legged kittiwake, Rissa tridactyla; three-cornered garlic, Allium triquetrum	
tricho-, -thrix	G θρίξ (thríx), τριχ- (trikh-)	hair	Prunus polytricha, a cherry species	
tripartitus	L	three-part	threepart violet, Viola tripartita; threetip sagebrush, Artemisia tripartita	–
tristis	L	sad, disagreeable, bitter, foul	ever-flowering gladiolus, Gladiolus tristis American goldfinch, Carduelis tristis Mupli beetle, Luprops tristis	
trivialis	L	commonplace, ordinary	tree pipit, Anthus trivialis; southern dewberry, Rubus trivialis; northern water plantain, Alisma triviale; Bulbophyllum triviale, an orchid	–
troglodytes	L G τρωγλοδύτης (trōglodútēs)	cave-dweller	chimpanzee, Pan troglodytes; wren, Troglodytes troglodytes	
tropicalis	L	tropical	Candida tropicalis (yeast); Rostraureum tropicale (fungus)	–
truncatus	L	truncated, foreshortened	common bottlenose dolphin, Tursiops truncatus; pink fairy armadillo, Chlamyphorus truncatus; rattlesnake flower, Brazoria truncata; false Christmas cactus, Schlumbergera truncata; Shantung maple, Acer truncatum; truncate leek orchid, Prasophyllum truncatum	– –
trygon	G τρῡγών (trygōn)	stingray turtledove	Fontitrygon, Hemitrygon, Trygonoptera, all ray genera Geotrygon and Trugon, dove genera	– –
typhlo-	G τυφλός (typhlós)	blind	Typhlobarbus nudiventris, fish species; Typhlochactidae, scorpion family	
tyranno-	G τύραννος (túrannos)	tyrant, tyrannical	Tyrannosaurus rex; Tyrannodoris; Tyrannoneustes; Tyrannotitan;	

== U ==
Latin/Greek	Language	English	Example	Search for titles containing the word or using the prefix:
-uchus, -ucha, -ucho	G -ούχος (-oúkhos)	owner, bearer	Corythucha, moth genus; Tympanuchus, prairie chicken; Elasmucha, shield bug genus; Meniscuchus, fossil trilobite	
ulmus	L	elm	American elm, Ulmus americana; elmleaf goldenrod, Solidago ulmifolia; Siberian elm, Ulmus pumila; Ulmus	
ulos	G οὖλος (oûlos)	woolly	Uloborus; Ulotrichi; Ulotrichopus	
uncus	L	hook, barb	Scymnus uncus, lady beetle species; silver hook moth, Lithacodia uncula Trichopetalum uncum, millipede; genera Uncifera, Uncinaria	– – –
unus	L	one	Monotropa uniflora; unicolor woolly lemur, Avahi unicolor	
ura	G οὐρά (ourá)	of the tail	mourning dove, Zenaida macroura; coral snake, Micrurus corallinus	

== V ==
Latin/Greek	Language	English	Examples	Search for titles containing the word or using the prefix:
vaginalis	L	sheathed, vaginal	Alyce clover, Gardnerella vaginalis	
variabilis	L	variable	grey bunting, Emberiza variabilis	–
varians	L	varying (usually in color)	Chameleon shrimp, Hippolyte varians Chelidonura varians; Chelidonura varians	
variegatus	L	variegated	variegated laughingthrush, Garrulax variegatus; croton, Codiaeum variegatum	– –
varius	L	different, variegated, variable	lace monitor, Varanus varius; yellow-bellied sapsucker, Sphyrapicus varius barred owl, Strix varia; purple crown vetch, Securigera varia variable triplefin, Forsterygion varium; grass cerith, Bittiolum varium	– –
velox, velocis	L	swift	swift fox, Vulpes velox; Velociraptor	
ventralis	L	ventral, of the belly	Hispaniolan parrot, Amazona ventralis; southern dwarf chameleon, Bradypodion ventrale	–
venustus	L	beautiful	giraffe hap, Nimbochromis venustus; beautiful pit viper, Trimeresurus venustus flamevine, Pyrostegia venusta; orchard spider, Leucauge venusta Himalayan maidenhair, Adiantum venustum; magnificent leafy moss, Plagiomnium venustum	– –
vernicosa	L	varnished	varnished maxillaria, Maxillaria vernicosa	– –
vernus, vernalis	L	spring (season)	spring gentian, Gentiana verna; spring pheasant's eye, Adonis vernalis; spring sneezeweed, Helenium vernale	–
verrucosus	L	rough-skinned	Javan warty pig, Sus verrucosus; reef stonefish, Synanceia verrucosa	– –
versicolor	L	many-colored	varied honeyeater, Lichenostomus versicolor; Vietnam mouse-deer, Tragulus versicolor	
verticillata	L	whorled	spaghetti bryozoan, Amathia verticillata; whorled plectranthus, Plectranthus verticillatus	– –
verus	L	true, genuine	true aloe, Aloe vera; lady's bedstraw, Galium verum	–
victoriae	L	Victorian	Victoria's bar, Cigaritis victoriae	
villosus	L	hairy, shaggy	hairy nightshade, Solanum villosum; hairy stonecrop, Sedum villosum; hairy vetch, Vicia villosa; hairy woodpecker, Picoides villosus; shaggy hawkweed, Hieracium villosum; villous deadly carrot, Thapsia villosa	– –
virginiana	L	Virginia	Virginia opossum, Didelphis virginiana; Rosa virginiana, the Virginia rose	–
viridis	L	green	frog orchid, Coeloglossum viride; green alder, Alnus viridis; green wrasse, Labrus viridis	–
virosus	L	poisonous	cowbane, Cicuta virosa; poisonous lettuce, Lactuca virosa	–
viticola (vitis-cola)	L	grape vine inhabitant or cultivator	Phomopsis viticola; Plasmopara viticola; Schizomyia viticola	
volans	L	flying	flying dragon, Draco volans; southern flying squirrel, Glaucomys volans	
vulgaris	L	common	common octopus, Octopus vulgaris; common privet, Ligustrum vulgare	–

== X–Z ==
Latin/Greek	Language	English	Example	Search for titles containing the word or using the prefix:
xanthos	G ξανθός	yellow	yellow staining mushroom, Agaricus xanthodermus	
zebratus	L	cross-striped	Kolombatovic's goby, Chromogobius zebratus	
zoster	G ζωστήρ (zōstḗr)	belt, girdle	white-eyes, Zosterops; Zosterophyllum; Zosterocarpus abyssicola	
zygos	G ζυγός	joined	Zygophyllum; Zygoptera	

== See also ==
- Glossary of scientific naming
- List of commonly used taxonomic affixes
- List of descriptive plant species epithets (A–H)
- List of descriptive plant species epithets (I–Z)
- List of Greek and Latin roots in English
- List of Latin place names used as specific names
- List of Latin words with English derivatives
- List of medical roots, suffixes and prefixes
- List of taxa named by anagrams
