= I. minutus =

I. minutus may refer to:

- Imperceptus minutus, a jumping spider species found in India
- Ixobrychus minutus, the little bittern, a wading bird species native to the Old World

== See also ==
- List of Latin and Greek words commonly used in systematic names#M
