= A. terrestris =

A. terrestris may refer to:

- Actinochloris terrestris, an alga species
- Arvicola terrestris, the European Water Vole, a mammal species

== See also ==
- Terrestris
