= C. aurantium =

C. aurantium may refer to:

- Citrus aurantium, the bitter orange, a plant species
- Cypraea aurantium, the golden cowrie, a snail species

== See also ==
- Aurantium
