= Sanctus (species) =

The species name sanctus (Latin for 'sacred') occurs in several binomial names in the taxonomy of life. Examples include:

- Confuciusornis sanctus, a prehistoric primitive bird
- Rubus ulmifolius subsp. sanctus, or holy bramble
- Sphenomorphus sanctus, the java forest skink
- Tarachodes sanctus, a species of praying mantis
- Todiramphus sanctus, the sacred kingfisher
