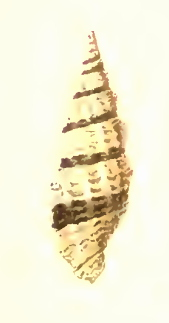
- Drawing of a shell of Vexillum clathratum (holotype)

Scientific classification
- Kingdom: Animalia
- Phylum: Mollusca
- Class: Gastropoda
- Subclass: Caenogastropoda
- Order: Neogastropoda
- Superfamily: Turbinelloidea
- Family: Costellariidae
- Genus: Vexillum
- Species: V. clathratum

Binomial name
- Vexillum clathratum (Reeve, 1844)

Synonyms
- Mitra clathrata Reeve, 1844; Vexillum (Costellaria) clathratum (Reeve, 1844)

= Vexillum clathratum =

Species of gastropod

Vexillum clathratum, common name the latticed mitre, is a species of sea snail, a marine gastropod mollusk, in the family Costellariidae, the ribbed miters.

== Description ==
The length of the shell attains 35 mm.

(Original description) The shell is rather elongated. The spire is turreted, acuminately produced. The whorls are depressly angulated at the upper part, longitudinally ribbed, strongly latticed with close-set, raised, transverse ridges. The shell is white. The whorls are encircled round the middle with a single light brown band. The columella is slightly umbilicated and four-plaited. The aperture is rather short.

== Distribution ==
This marine species occurs off the Philippines; in the Indian Ocean off Mauritius.
