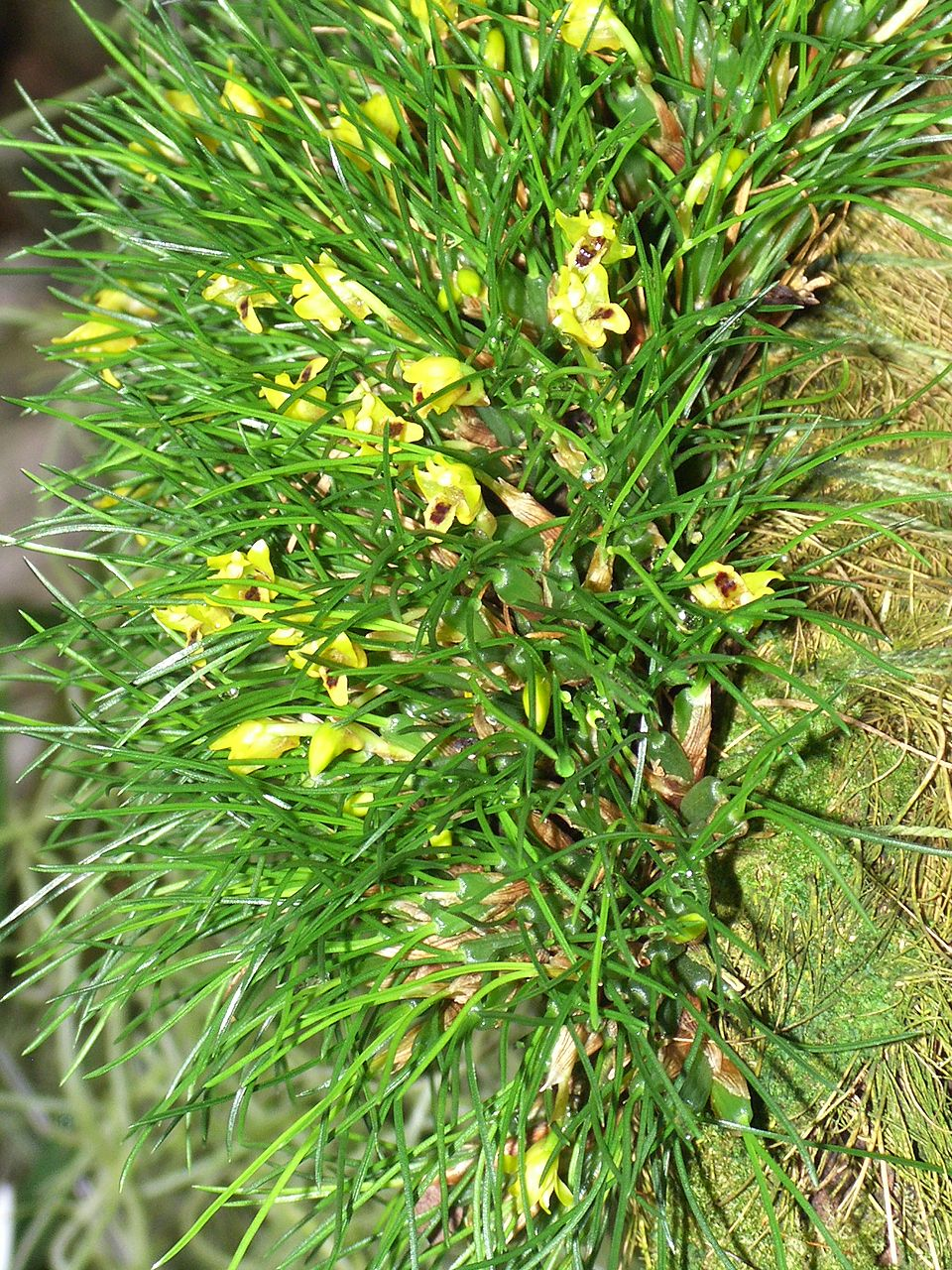

Scientific classification
- Kingdom: Plantae
- Clade: Tracheophytes
- Clade: Angiosperms
- Clade: Monocots
- Order: Asparagales
- Family: Orchidaceae
- Subfamily: Epidendroideae
- Genus: Maxillaria
- Species: M. neowiedii

Binomial name
- Maxillaria neowiedii Rchb.f.

Synonyms
- Christensonella neowiedii (Rchb.f.) S.Koehler; Christensonella vernicosa (Barb.Rodr.) Szlach., Mytnik, Górniak & Smiszek; Christensonella vitelliniflora (Barb.Rodr.) Szlach., Mytnik, Górniak & Smiszek; Maxillaria neowiedii var. longifolia Cogn.; Maxillaria vernicosa Barb.Rodr.; Maxillaria vitelliniflora Barb.Rodr.

= Maxillaria neowiedii =

Species of orchid

Maxillaria neowiedii is a species of orchid ranging from Brazil to Argentina (Misiones Province).
