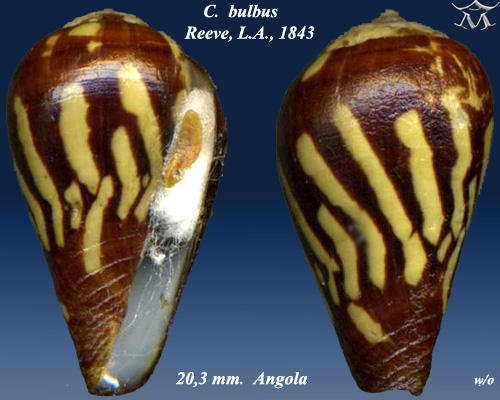
- Apertural and abapertural views of shell of Conus bulbus Reeve, L.A., 1843
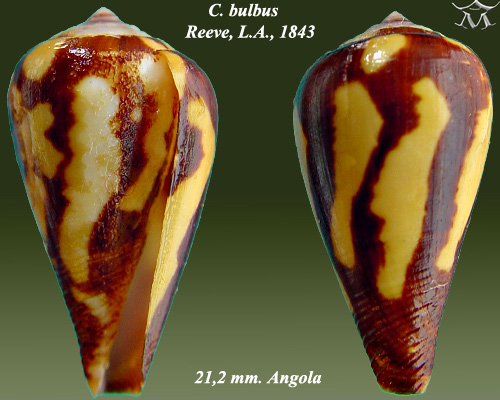

Conservation status
- Least Concern (IUCN 3.1)

Scientific classification
- Kingdom: Animalia
- Phylum: Mollusca
- Class: Gastropoda
- Subclass: Caenogastropoda
- Order: Neogastropoda
- Superfamily: Conoidea
- Family: Conidae
- Genus: Conus
- Species: C. bulbus

Binomial name
- Conus bulbus Reeve, 1843

Synonyms
- Conus (Lautoconus) bulbus Reeve, 1843 · accepted, alternate representation; Varioconus bulbus (Reeve, 1843)

= Conus bulbus =

Species of sea snail

Conus bulbus, common name the onion cone, is a species of sea snail, a marine gastropod mollusk in the family Conidae, the cone snails and their allies.

Like all species within the genus Conus, these snails are predatory and venomous. They are capable of stinging humans, therefore live ones should be handled carefully or not at all.

== Description ==
The size of the shell varies between 15 mm and 45 mm.

== Distribution ==
This species occurs in the Atlantic Ocean off Angola
