= Macrochloris dissecta =

Scientific classification
- Clade: Viridiplantae
- Division: Chlorophyta
- Class: Chlorophyceae
- Order: Chlamydomonadales
- Family: Actinochloridaceae
- Genus: Macrochloris
- Species: M. dissecta

Binomial name
- Macrochloris dissecta Korshikov

Synonyms
- Actinochloris terrestris (Vischer) Ettl & Gärtner; Asterococcus terrestris Vischer; Radiococcus dissecta (Korshikov) R.C.Starr; Radiosphaera dissecta (Korshikov) Starr

Species of alga

Macrochloris dissecta is a species of algae in the family Actinochloridaceae.
