= Acalolepta stictica =

Scientific classification
- Kingdom: Animalia
- Phylum: Arthropoda
- Class: Insecta
- Order: Coleoptera
- Suborder: Polyphaga
- Infraorder: Cucujiformia
- Family: Cerambycidae
- Genus: Acalolepta
- Species: A. stictica

Binomial name
- Acalolepta stictica (Breuning, 1948)

Synonyms
- Dihammus sticticus Breuning, 1948

Species of beetle

Acalolepta stictica is a species of beetle in the family Cerambycidae. It was described by Stephan von Breuning in 1948. It is known from Sumatra.
