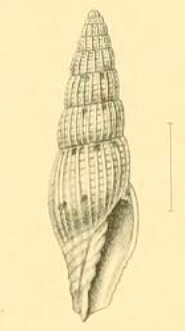
- Shell of Vexillum angustissimum (holotype)

Scientific classification
- Kingdom: Animalia
- Phylum: Mollusca
- Class: Gastropoda
- Subclass: Caenogastropoda
- Order: Neogastropoda
- Family: Costellariidae
- Genus: Vexillum
- Species: V. angustissimum

Binomial name
- Vexillum angustissimum (E. A. Smith, 1903)

Synonyms
- Mitra (Costellaria) angustissima E. A. Smith, 1903; Mitra angustissima E.A. Smith 1903; Vexillum (Costellaria) angustissimum (E.A. Smith, 1903)

= Vexillum angustissimum =

Species of gastropod

Vexillum angustissimum is a species of small sea snail, marine gastropod mollusk in the family Costellariidae, the ribbed miters.

== Description ==
The length of the shell varies between 13 mm and 17 mm.

This species is remarkable for its very slender form and the punctate striae between the ribs. The folds on the columella correspond to the oblique ridges between the sulci on the cauda of the body whorl. These ridges are spotted with pale brown. It does not perform broadcast spawning.

== Distribution ==
This marine species occurs in the Indo-Pacific; also off Australia (Northern Territory, Queensland, Western Australia).
