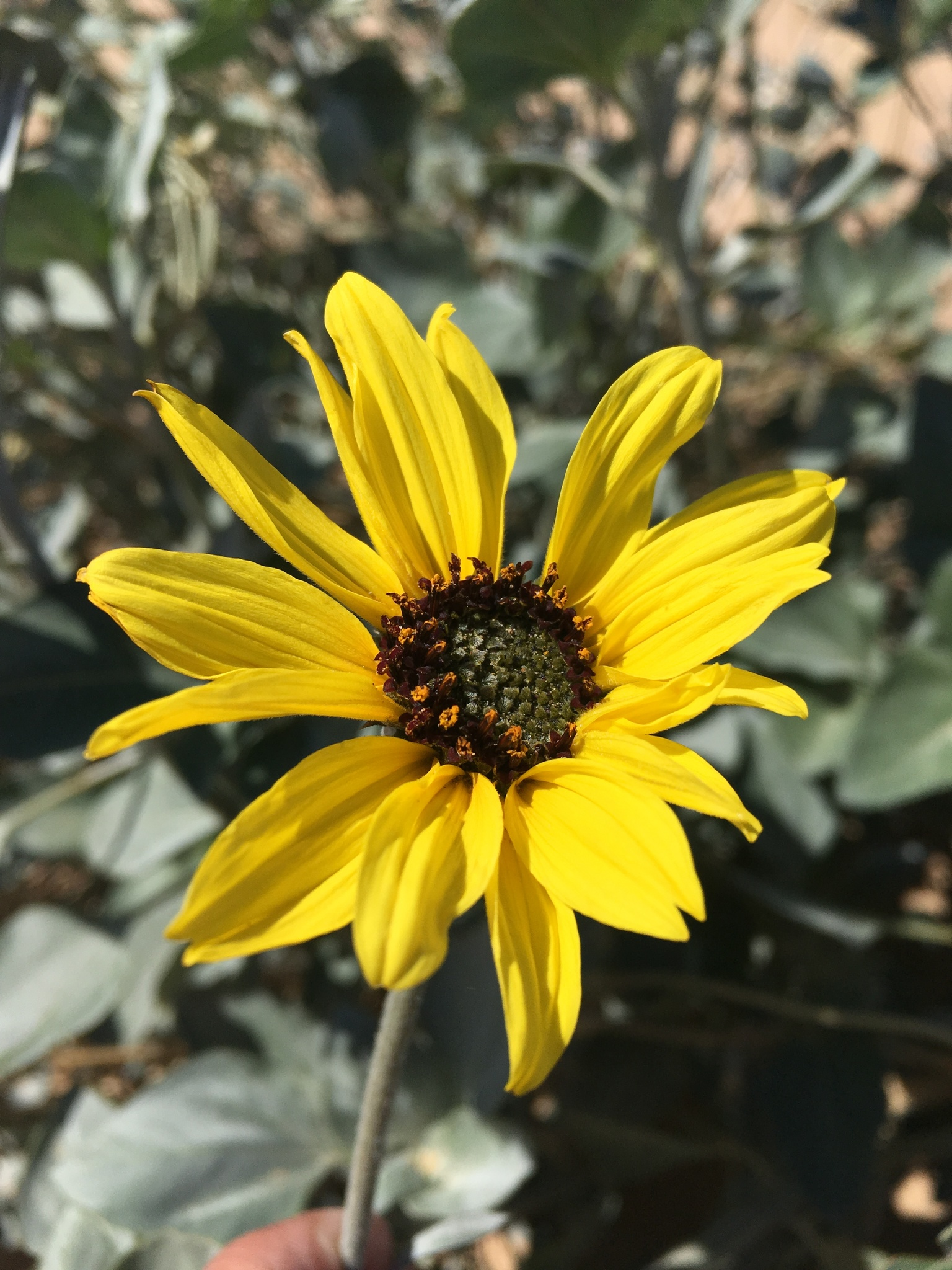
- Helianthus niveus subsp. tephrodes

Conservation status
- Data Deficient (IUCN 3.1)

Scientific classification
- Kingdom: Plantae
- Clade: Tracheophytes
- Clade: Angiosperms
- Clade: Eudicots
- Clade: Asterids
- Order: Asterales
- Family: Asteraceae
- Tribe: Heliantheae
- Genus: Helianthus
- Species: H. niveus

Binomial name
- Helianthus niveus (Benth.) Brandeg. 1889 not Hieron. 1895

Synonyms
- Encelia nivea Benth.; Helianthus dealbatus A.Gray; Viguiera nivea Benth. & Hook.f.; Helianthus tephrodes A.Gray; Viguiera tephrodes (A.Gray) A.Gray

= Helianthus niveus =

Species of sunflower

Helianthus niveus is a species of sunflower known by the common names showy sunflower and snowy sunflower. It is native to northern Mexico (Sonora, Baja California, Baja California Sur) and the Southwestern United States (Southern California, Arizona, New Mexico, and West Texas).

Helianthus niveus is a taprooted annual or perennial sunflower growing to a maximum height over 1 m (40 in). The leaves are oval or lance-shaped, often with irregular lobes or teeth, and are covered in soft, white hairs. The flower heads are fringed with 13-21 bright yellow ray florets up to 2.5 cm (1 in) long surrounding a center of yellow to purple-red disc florets.

== Habitat ==
H. niveus grows in sandy soils, most often in sand dunes.
