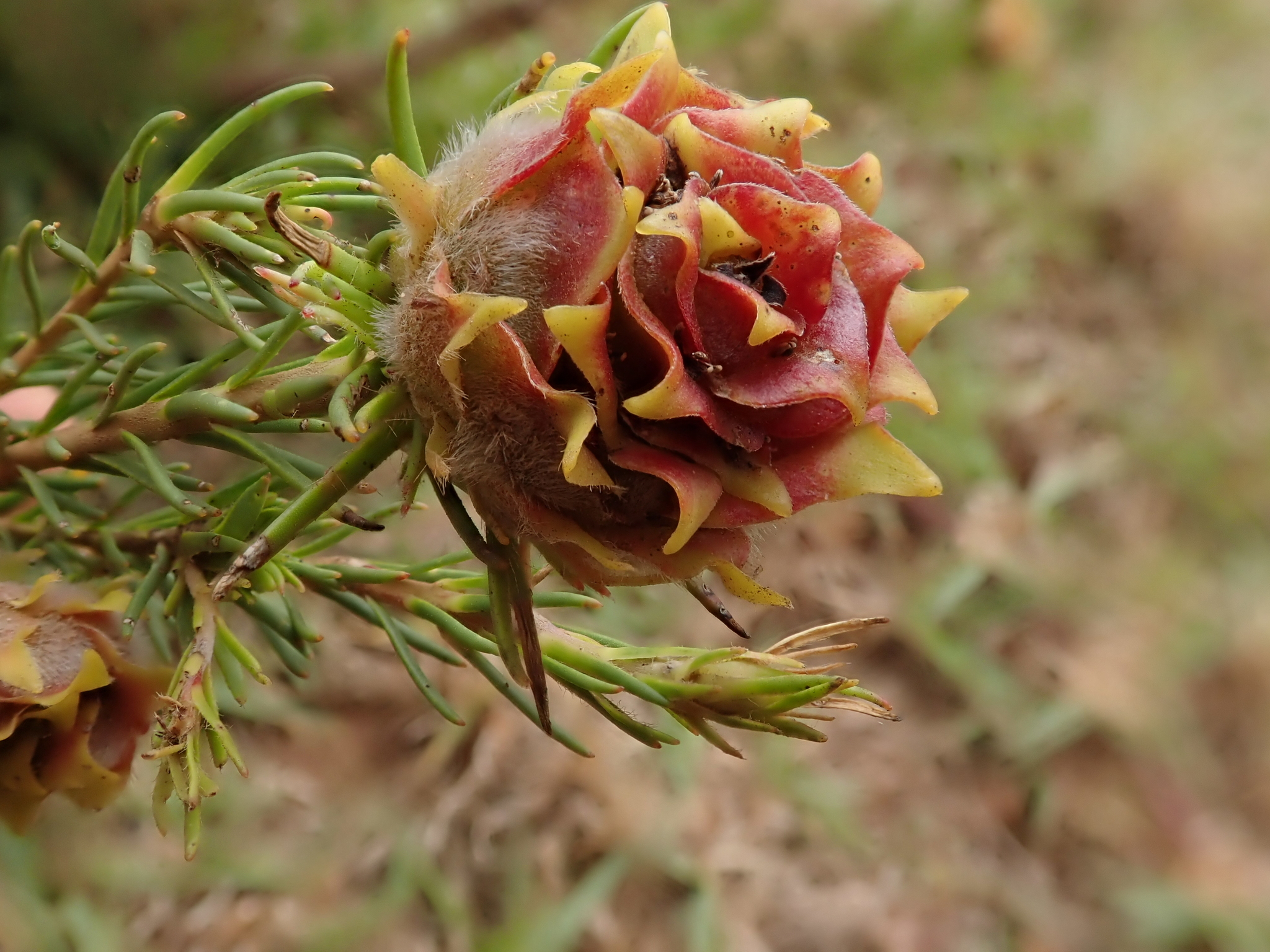

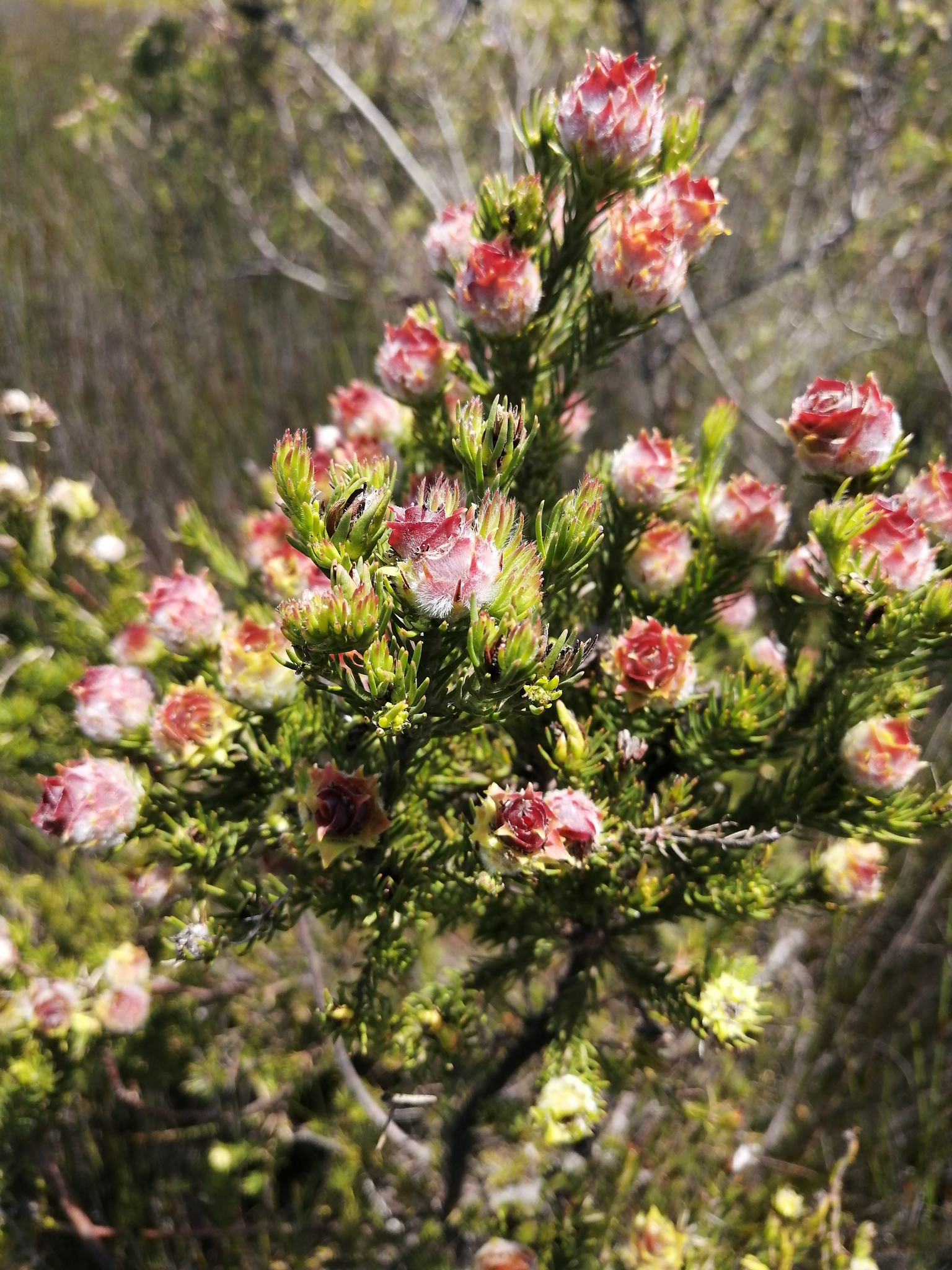

Conservation status
- Endangered (IUCN 3.1)

Scientific classification
- Kingdom: Plantae
- Clade: Tracheophytes
- Clade: Angiosperms
- Clade: Eudicots
- Order: Proteales
- Family: Proteaceae
- Genus: Leucadendron
- Species: L. laxum

Binomial name
- Leucadendron laxum I.Williams

= Leucadendron laxum =

Species of plant

Leucadendron laxum, the Bredasdorp conebush, is a flower-bearing shrub belonging to the genus Leucadendron and forms part of the fynbos. The plant is native to the Western Cape, South Africa, where it occurs from Hermanus to Agulhas.

== Description ==
The shrub grows 1.75 m (5.7 ft) tall and bears flowers from September to October. Fire destroys the plant but the seeds survive. The seeds are stored in a toll on the female plant and will be released during March the following year. The plant is unisexual and there are male and female plants. The plants are pollinated by the action of insects.

In Afrikaans, it is known as Vleirosie.

== Gallery ==
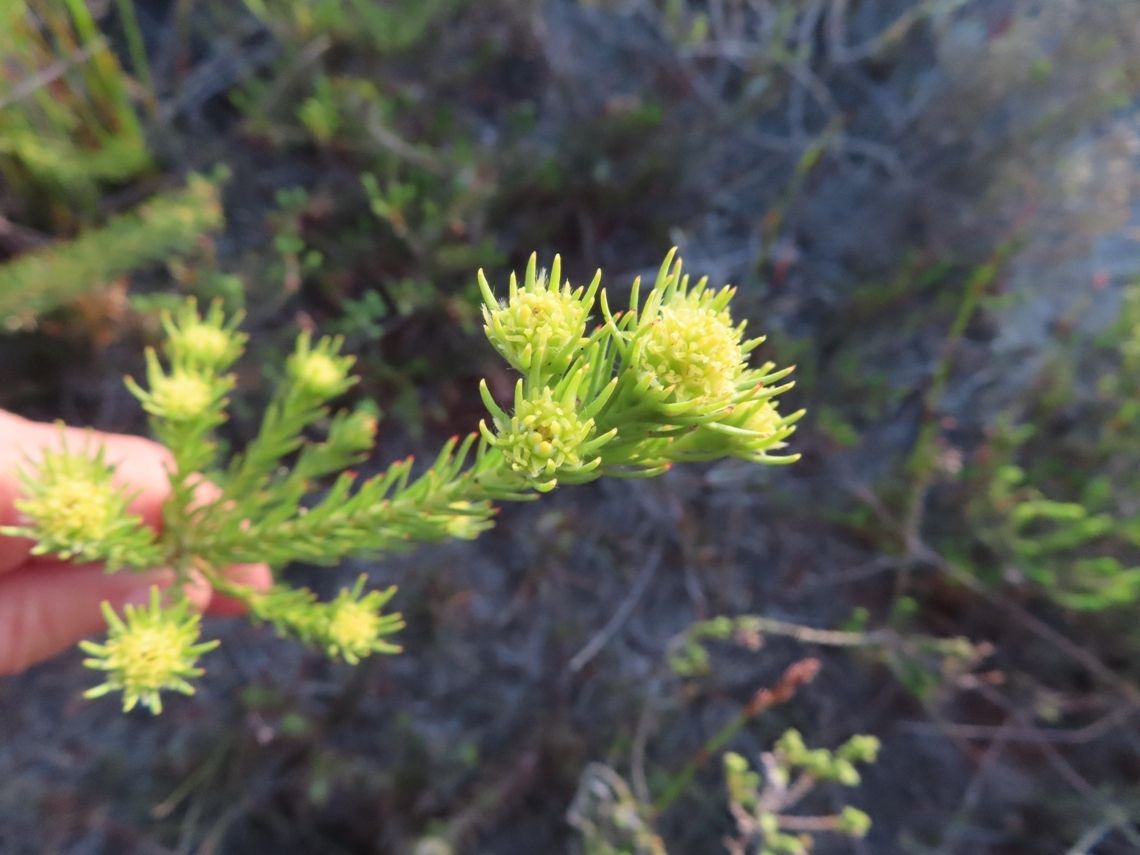

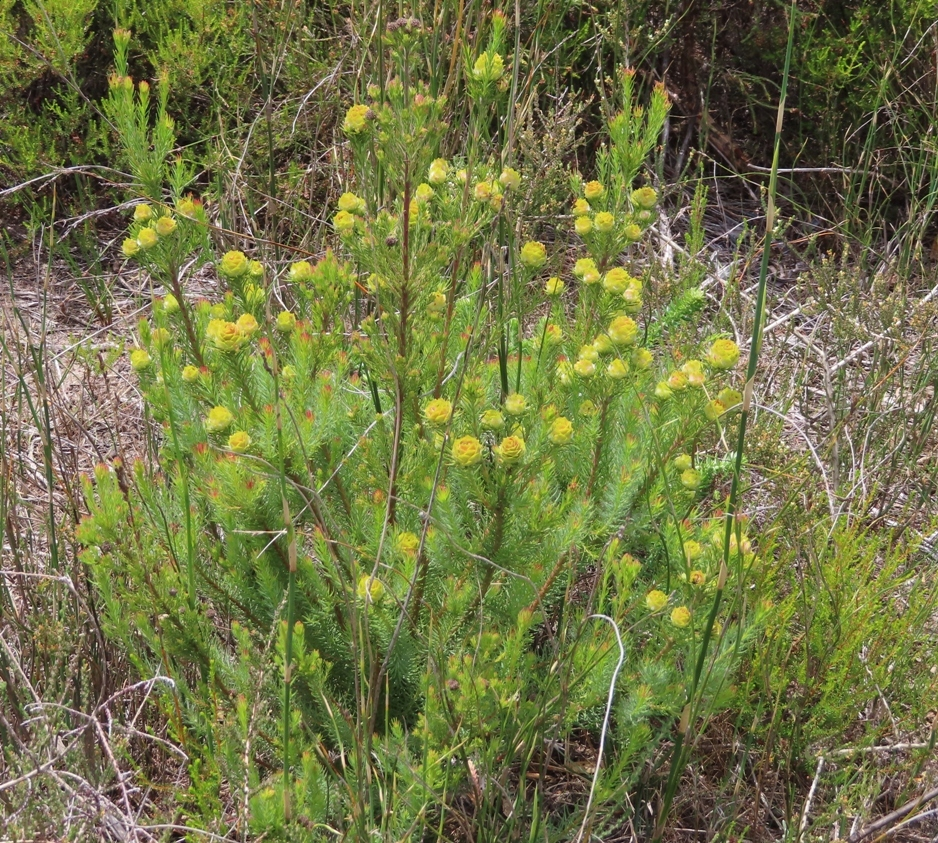

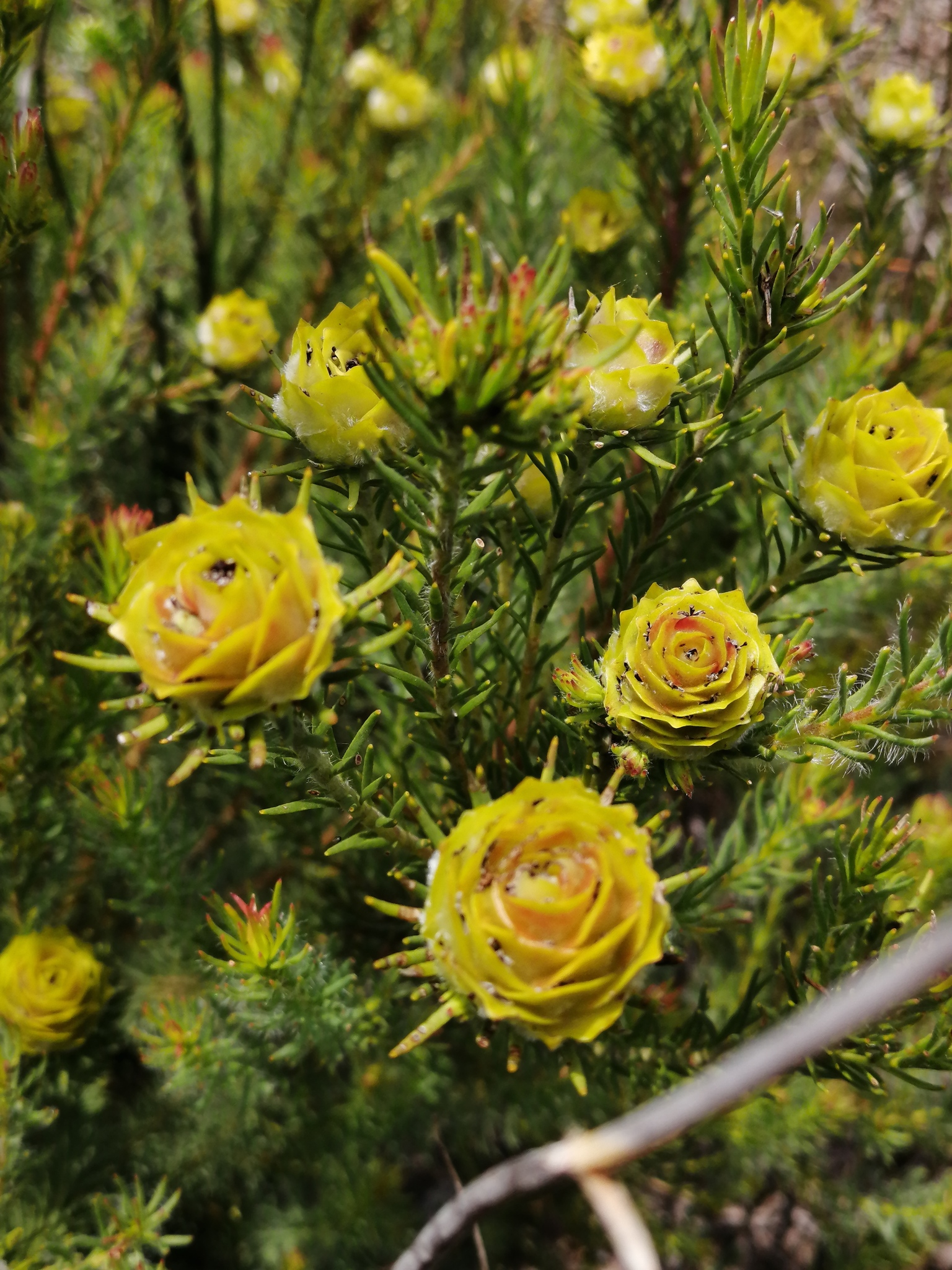

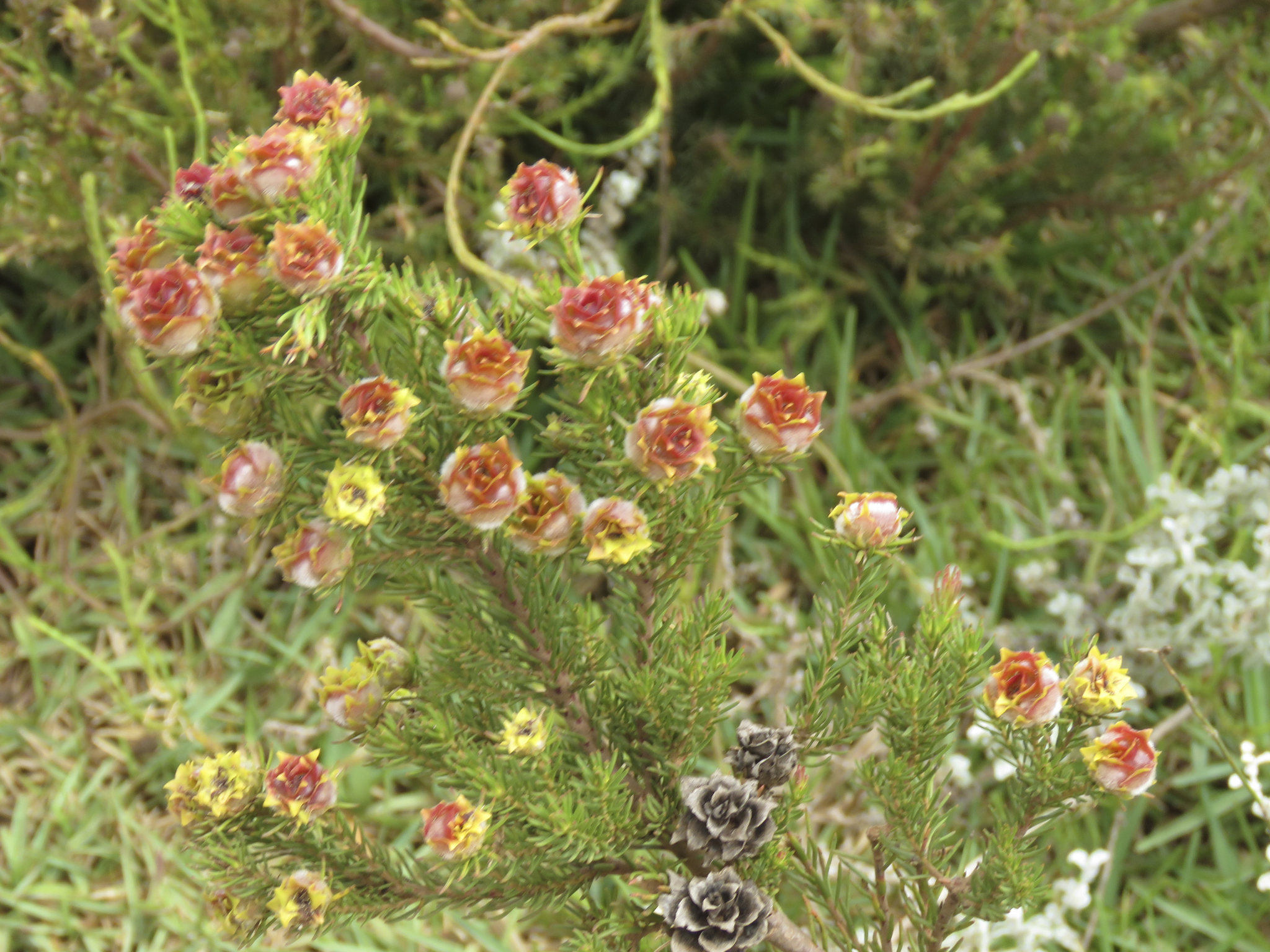

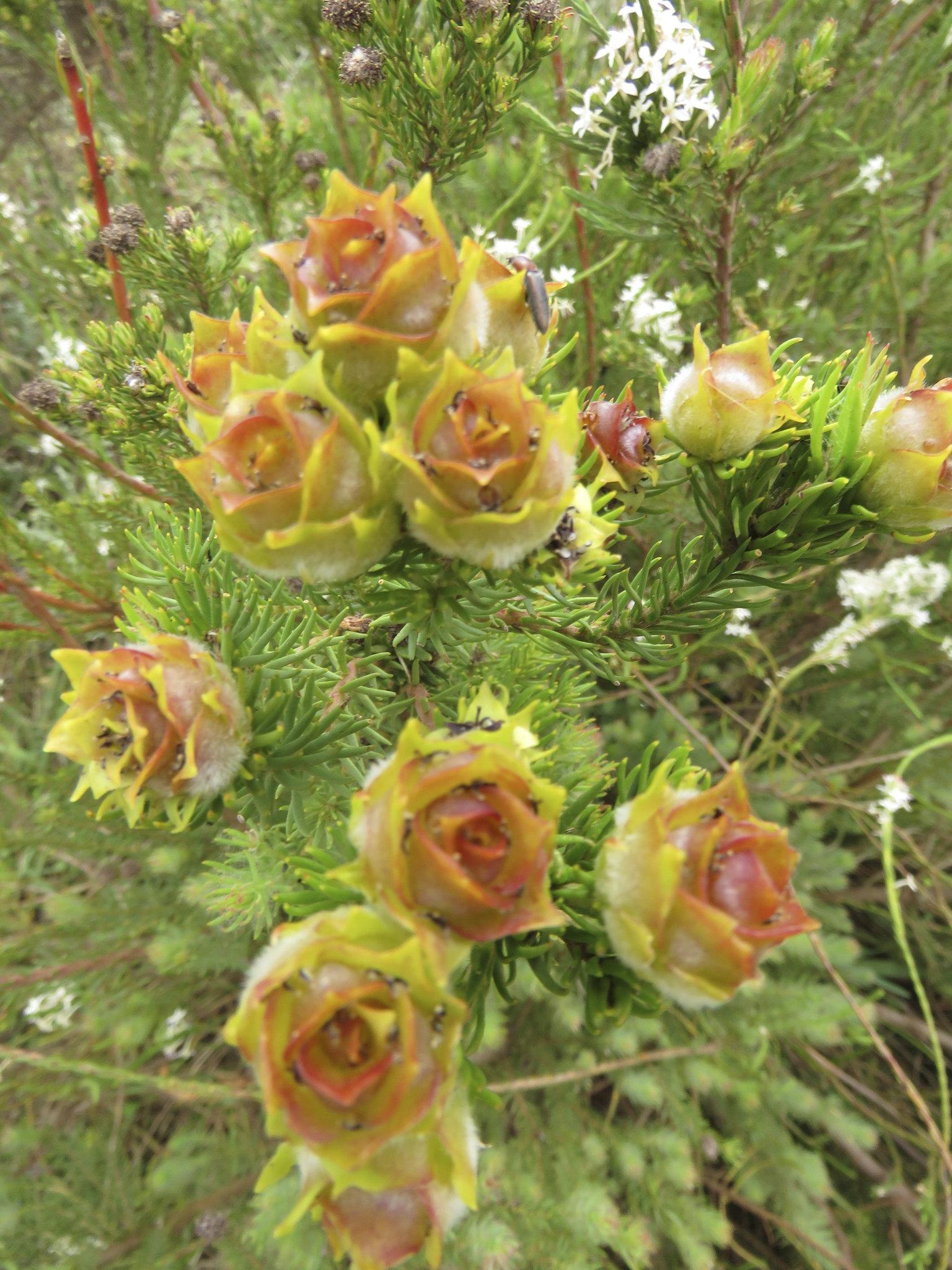
