= Juncus digitatus =

Conservation status
- Critically Imperiled (NatureServe)

Scientific classification
- Kingdom: Plantae
- Clade: Embryophytes
- Clade: Tracheophytes
- Clade: Spermatophytes
- Clade: Angiosperms
- Clade: Monocots
- Clade: Commelinids
- Order: Poales
- Family: Juncaceae
- Genus: Juncus
- Species: J. digitatus

Binomial name
- Juncus digitatus C.W.Witham & Zika

Species of grass

Juncus digitatus is a rare species of rush known by the common name finger rush. It is endemic to Shasta County, California, where it is known from only two occurrences near Shingletown. It occurs in spring-moist habitat such as vernal pools in sunny locations in the foothills of the southernmost Cascade Range. The plant was first collected in 1991 and described to science as a new species in 2008.

== Description ==
Juncus digitatus is an annual herb forming small, dense clumps of thin, almost hairlike stems which are red in color much of the time and measure up to 10 centimeters tall. The leaves have blades no more than about 2 centimeters long and are mostly limited to the base of the plant.

The inflorescence is a single flower or a cluster of up to 8 flowers at the tips of the stems. Each flower has six lance-shaped tepals a few millimeters in length which are reddish to greenish darkening to purplish near the tips. The fruit is a red or brownish, fingerlike capsule 1 to 2 centimeters long.

Conservation

Juncus digitatus is most closely related to Juncus triformis, which grows alongside it in one of the populations but not the other. Both populations of the plant are threatened.

Suitable habitat has been reduced by the conversion of the land to agriculture. The spring water that feeds its natural habitat has been diverted by pipeline from one population, and the other may be impacted by ornamental rock mining.
