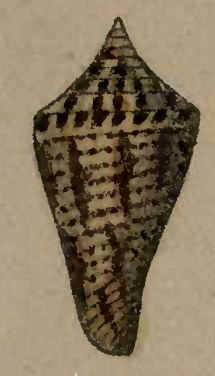
- Drawing of a shell of Conus monilifer

Scientific classification
- Kingdom: Animalia
- Phylum: Mollusca
- Class: Gastropoda
- Subclass: Caenogastropoda
- Order: Neogastropoda
- Superfamily: Conoidea
- Family: Conidae
- Genus: Conus
- Species: C. monilifer

Binomial name
- Conus monilifer Broderip, 1833

Synonyms
- Conus (Dauciconus) monilifer Broderip, 1833 · accepted, alternate representation; Conus ferrugatus G. B. Sowerby I, 1834; Conus selectus A. Adams, 1855; Gradiconus monilifer (Broderip, 1833)

= Conus monilifer =

Species of sea snail

Conus monilifer is a species of sea snail, a marine gastropod mollusk in the family Conidae, the cone snails and their allies.

Like all species within the genus Conus, these snails are predatory and venomous. They are capable of stinging humans, therefore live ones should be handled carefully or not at all.

== Description ==
The size of the shell varies between 35 mm and 50 mm.

== Distribution ==
This marine species occurs off Ecuador.
