= Imperceptus =

Scientific classification
- Kingdom: Animalia
- Phylum: Arthropoda
- Subphylum: Chelicerata
- Class: Arachnida
- Order: Araneae
- Infraorder: Araneomorphae
- Family: Salticidae
- Genus: Imperceptus; Prószynski, 1992
- Species: I. minutus

Binomial name
- Imperceptus minutus Prószyński, 1992

Genus of spiders

Imperceptus is a genus of jumping spiders found in India. Its single described species is Imperceptus minutus.
