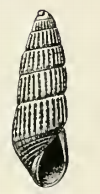
- Drawing of a shell of Turbonilla macra

Scientific classification
- Kingdom: Animalia
- Phylum: Mollusca
- Class: Gastropoda
- Family: Pyramidellidae
- Genus: Turbonilla
- Species: T. macra

Binomial name
- Turbonilla macra Dall & Bartsch, 1909

Synonyms
- Turbonilla (Pyrgiscus) macra Dall & Bartsch, 1909

= Turbonilla macra =

Species of gastropod

Turbonilla macra is a species of sea snail, a marine gastropod mollusk in the family Pyramidellidae, the pyrams and their allies.

== Description ==
The very small shell is subcylindric in the middle, tapering rapidly at the apex. Its length measures 3.2 mm. The early whorls are wax-yellow, the later ones white, with a very broad, wax-yellow band at the periphery, which extends above the sutures and on the base. The whorls of the protoconch are very small, and number at least two. They form a depressed helicoid spire, which is obliquely half immersed in the first of the succeeding turns. The seven whorls of the teleoconch are moderately rounded at first, later flattened. They are ornamented by almost straight, vertical, slender, well-developed axial ribs, of which there are 22 upon the first, 24 upon the second to fifth, and 25 upon the penultimate turn. The intercostal spaces about as wide as the ribs, marked by five equal but not equally spaced series of spiral pits. The first four of these above the periphery are equally spaced; the fifth is a little nearer to the summit of the whorl than its neighbor. The sutures are well impressed. The periphery of the body whorl is well rounded. It is marked by the feeble continuations of the axial ribs. The base of the body whorl is prolonged, and well rounded. it is marked by six equally spaced and equally strongly incised spiral lines. The aperture is ovate. The posterior angle is acute. The outer lip is thin, showing the external markings within. The columella is moderately strong, reinforced by the base, and provided with a weak fold at its insertion. The parietal wall is covered with a thin callus.

== Distribution ==
The type specimen was found in the Pacific Ocean off Point Abreojos, Baja California Peninsula.
