= Calliostoma argentum =

Scientific classification
- Kingdom: Animalia
- Phylum: Mollusca
- Class: Gastropoda
- Subclass: Vetigastropoda
- Order: Trochida
- Family: Calliostomatidae
- Subfamily: Calliostomatinae
- Genus: Calliostoma
- Species: C. argentum

Binomial name
- Calliostoma argentum Quinn, 1992

Species of gastropod

Calliostoma argentum is a species of sea snail, a marine gastropod mollusk in the family Calliostomatidae.

== Description ==
The length of the shell attains 35 mm.

== Distribution ==
This marine species occurs in the West Indies and in the Caribbean Sea off Mexico at depths between 175 m and 348 m.
