= A. insularis =

A. insularis may refer to:

- Abacetus insularis, a ground beetle
- Acalolepta insularis, a longhorn beetle found in Indonesia
- Acinia insularis, a synonym of Campiglossa reticulata, a tephritid fly found in Madeira and the Canary Islands
- Acmocera insularis, a longhorn beetle
- Acraea insularis, a butterfly found in São Tomé Island
  - Actinote insularis, a synonym of Acraea insularis
- Acromantis insularis, the Luzon mantis, found in India, Sumatra, and Java
- Acronicta insularis, a moth found in North America
- Acrotrichis insularis, a featherwing beetle
- Adetaptera insularis, a longhorn beetle
- Adetus insularis, a longhorn beetle
- Afrochilis insularis, a bristletail found in Socotra
- Agama insularis, the insular agama, a lizard found in Guinea
- Aganais insularis, a synonym of Asota borbonica, a moth found in Africa
- Agrotis insularis, a synonym of Parabagrotis insularis, a moth found in North America
- Amata insularis, a moth found in Australia
- Ammospermophilus insularis, the Espíritu Santo antelope squirrel, a rodent found in Mexico
- Anacampsis insularis, a moth found in the West Indies
- Anatinomma insularis, a longhorn beetle
- Andropadus insularis, a synonym of Andropadus importunus, the sombre greenbul, a bird found in Africa
- Anoteropsis insularis, a spider found in New Zealand
- Antennaria insularis, a synonym of Antennaria dioica, a plant found in Europe, Asia, and the Aleutian Islands
- Aoraia insularis, the Rakiura ghost moth, found in New Zealand
- Aphelocoma insularis, the island scrub jay, a bird found in Santa Cruz Island
- Aplonis insularis, the Rennell starling, a bird found in Rennell Island
- Aplysina insularis, a sea sponge
- Aponia insularis, a moth found in Cuba
- Arachnorchis insularis, a synonym of Caladenia insularis, the French island spider orchid, a plant found in Australia
- Arctostaphylos insularis, island manzanita, a plant found in Santa Cruz Island
- Arses insularis, the ochre-collared monarch, a bird found in Yapen and New Guinea
- Astegopteryx insularis, an aphid
- Asura insularis, a moth found in the Louisiade Archipelago
- Asychna insularis, a synonym of Blastobasis insularis, a moth found in the Canary Islands and Madeira
- Atta insularis, a leafcutter ant found in Cuba
- Austrochthonius insularis, a pseudoscorpion found in the Crozet Islands
- Austrolestes insularis, a synonym of Indolestes insularis, a damselfly found in Australia
- Auximobasis insularis, a moth found in the West Indies
- Avena insularis, a wild oat native to Sicily and Tunisia
