= Latericius =

Latericius may refer to:

- Adetus latericius, species of beetle
- Arenibacter latericius, species of bacteria
