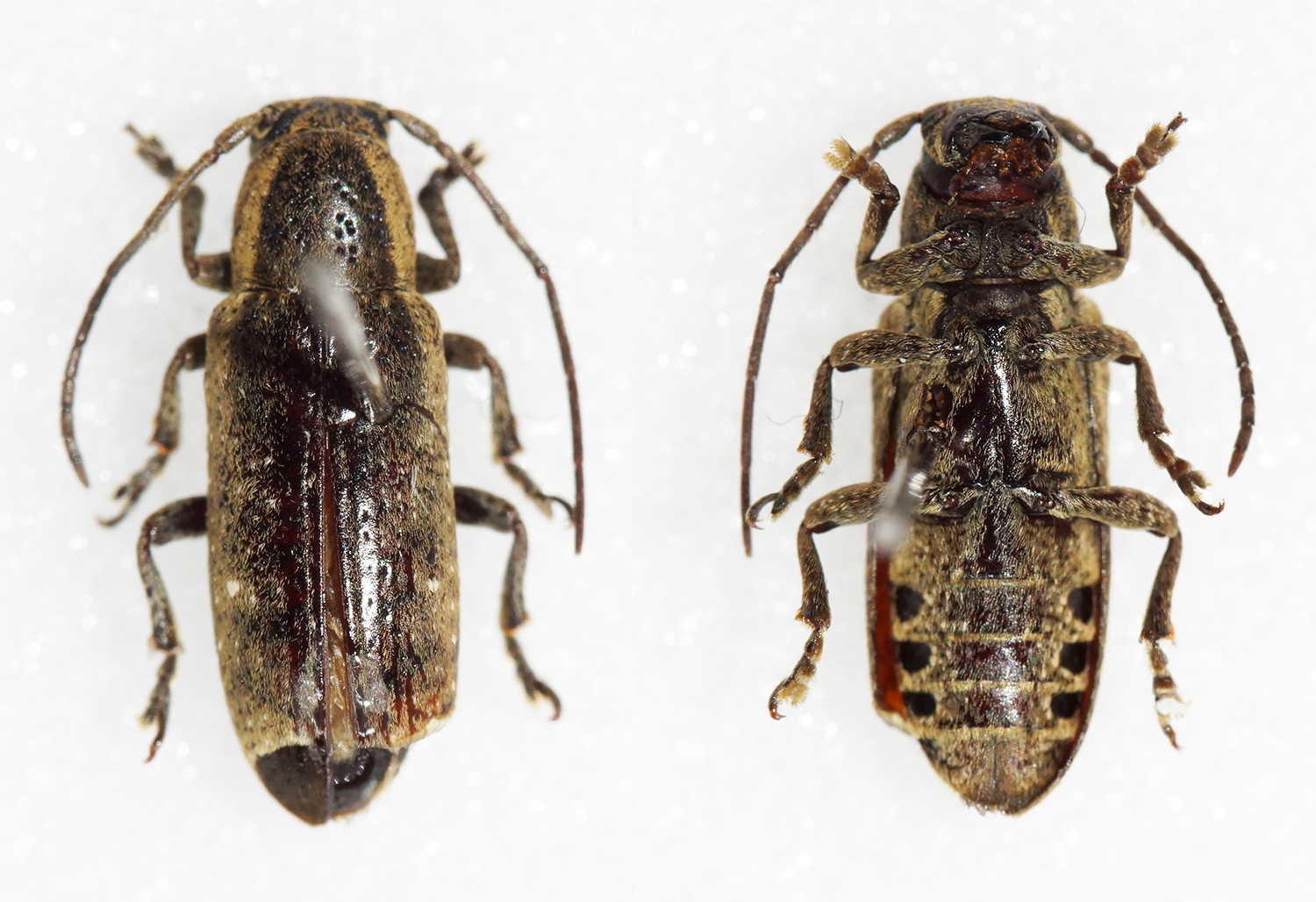
- Adetus similis

Scientific classification
- Kingdom: Animalia
- Phylum: Arthropoda
- Class: Insecta
- Order: Coleoptera
- Suborder: Polyphaga
- Infraorder: Cucujiformia
- Family: Cerambycidae
- Tribe: Apomecynini
- Genus: Adetus; LeConte, 1852

Synonyms
- Polyopsia Haldeman, 1847 (Preocc.); Agennopsis Thomson, 1857; Talaepora Fairmaire & Germain, 1859; Stygnesis Pascoe, 1866; Tautoclines Thomson, 1868; Ptericthya Thomson, 1868; Atimuropsis Thomson, 1868; Parmenonta Thomson, 1868; Sicyobius Horn, 1880; Pterichthya Bates, 1880 (Missp.); Pterichtya Aurivillius, 1922 (Missp.)

= Adetus =

Genus of beetles

Adetus is a genus of beetles in the family Cerambycidae.

== Species ==
- Adetus aberrans Galileo & Martins, 2003
- Adetus abruptus Belon, 1902
- Adetus alboapicalis Breuning, 1943
- Adetus albosignatus Breuning, 1943
- Adetus albovittatus Breuning, 1966
- Adetus analis (Haldeman, 1847)
- Adetus angustus Melzer, 1934
- Adetus antennatus (Thomson, 1868)
- Adetus atomarius Belon, 1902
- Adetus bacillarius Bates, 1885
- Adetus basalis Martins & Galileo, 2010
- Adetus binotatus (Thomson, 1868)
- Adetus brasiliensis (Melzer, 1923)
- Adetus brousi (Horn, 1880)
- Adetus cacapira Martins & Galileo, 2005
- Adetus catemaco Martins & Galileo, 2005
- Adetus cecamirim Martins & Galileo, 2005
- Adetus columbianus Breuning, 1948
- Adetus consors Bates, 1885
- Adetus costicollis Bates, 1872
- Adetus curtulus Bates, 1885
- Adetus curupira Galileo & Martins, 2006
- Adetus cylindricus (Bates, 1866)
- Adetus fasciatus Franz, 1959
- Adetus flavescens Melzer, 1934
- Adetus furculicauda (Bates, 1880)
- Adetus fuscoapicalis Breuning, 1942
- Adetus fuscopunctatus Aurivillius, 1900
- Adetus griseicauda (Bates, 1872)
- Adetus inaequalis (Thomson, 1868)
- Adetus inca Martins & Galileo, 2005
- Adetus insularis Breuning, 1940
- Adetus irregularis (Breuning, 1939)
- Adetus jacareacanga Galileo & Martins, 2004
- Adetus latericius Belon, 1902
- Adetus leucostigma Bates, 1880
- Adetus lewisi Linsley & Chemsak, 1984
- Adetus lherminieri Fleutiaux & Sallé, 1889
- Adetus lineatus Martins & Galileo, 2003
- Adetus linsleyi Martins & Galileo, 2003
- Adetus longicauda (Bates, 1880)
- Adetus marmoratus Breuning, 1942
- Adetus minimus Breuning, 1942
- Adetus modestus Melzer, 1934
- Adetus mucoreus Bates, 1885
- Adetus multifasciatus Martins & Galileo, 2003
- Adetus nanus (Fairmaire & Germain, 1859)
- Adetus nesiotes Linsley & Chemsak, 1966
- Adetus obliquatus Breuning, 1948
- Adetus obliquus (Bates, 1885)
- Adetus pacaruaia Martins & Galileo, 2003
- Adetus pictoides Breuning, 1973
- Adetus pictus Bates, 1880
- Adetus pinima Martins & Galileo, 2003
- Adetus pisciformis (Thomson, 1868)
- Adetus postilenatus Bates, 1885
- Adetus praeustus (Thomson, 1868)
- Adetus proximus Breuning, 1940
- Adetus pulchellus (Thomson, 1868)
- Adetus punctatus (Thomson, 1868)
- Adetus punctiger (Pascoe, 1866)
- Adetus pusillus (Fairmaire & Germain, 1859)
- Adetus salvadorensis Franz, 1954
- Adetus similis Bruch, 1939
- Adetus sordidus (Bates, 1866)
- Adetus spinipennis Breuning, 1971
- Adetus squamosus Chemsak & Noguera, 1993
- Adetus stellatus Martins & Galileo, 2008
- Adetus stramentosus Breuning, 1940
- Adetus striatopunctatus Breuning, 1940
- Adetus subcostatus Aurivillius, 1900
- Adetus subellipticus Bates, 1880
- Adetus tayronus Galileo & Martins, 2003
- Adetus tibialis Breuning, 1943
- Adetus trinidadensis Breuning, 1955
- Adetus truncatipennis Melzer, 1934
- Adetus tuberosus Galileo & Martins, 2003
- Adetus validus (Thomson, 1868)
- Adetus vanduzeei Linsley, 1934
