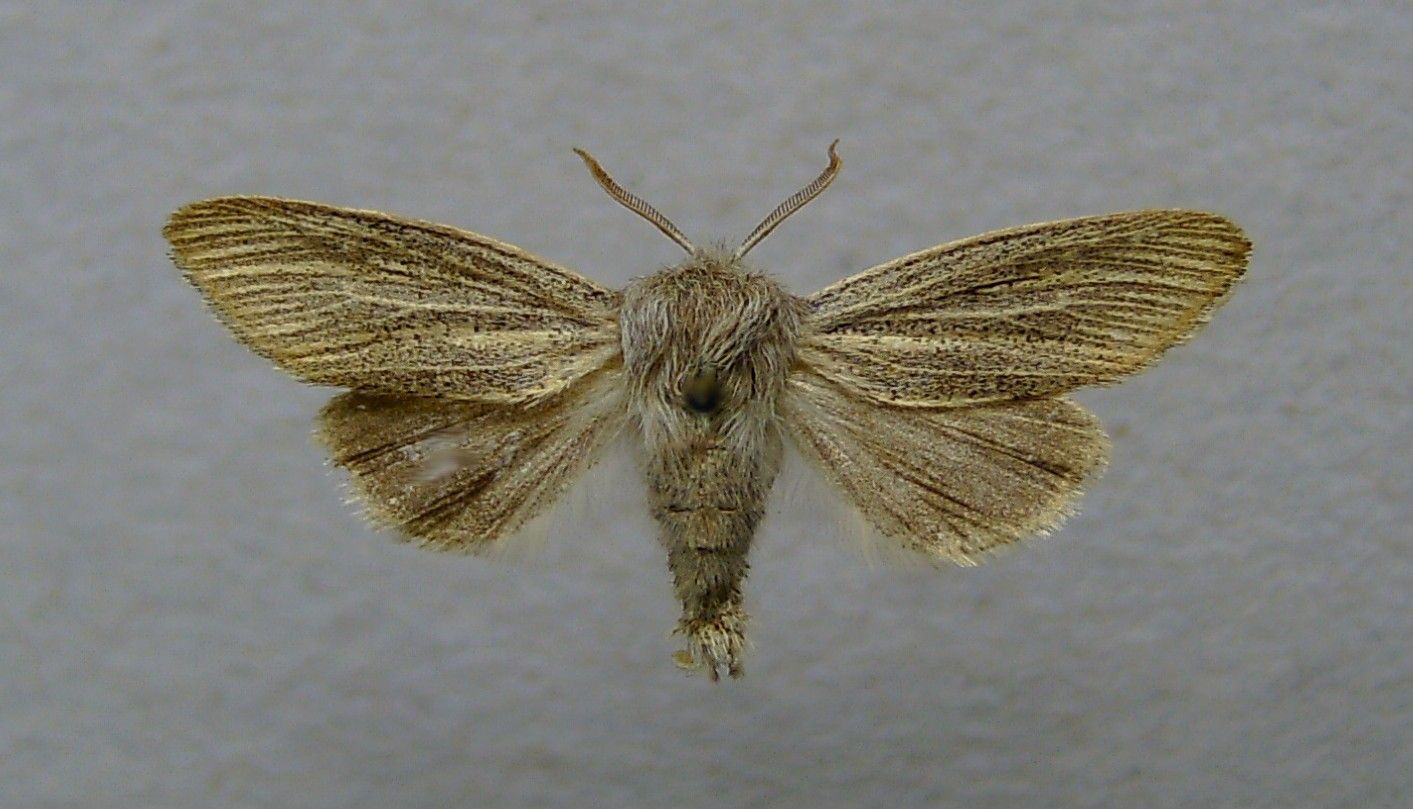
- Simyra nervosa

Scientific classification
- Domain: Eukaryota
- Kingdom: Animalia
- Phylum: Arthropoda
- Class: Insecta
- Order: Lepidoptera
- Superfamily: Noctuoidea
- Family: Noctuidae
- Subfamily: Acronictinae
- Genus: Simyra; Ochsenheimer, 1816

Synonyms
- Cnephata Billberg, 1820; Asema Sodoffsky, 1837; Nimyra Guenée, 1841; Arsilonche Lederer, 1857; Ablepharon Grote, 1873; Ommatostolidea Benjamin, 1933; Parasimyra Beck, 1996; Transsimyra (Parasimyra) Beck, 1996

= Simyra (moth) =

Genus of moths

Simyra is a genus of moths of the family Noctuidae. The genus was described by Ochsenheimer in 1816.

== Species ==
- Simyra nervosa (Denis & Schiffermüller, 1775) central and southern Europe
- Simyra albovenosa (Goeze, 1781) Europe, Turkey, northern Iran, Transcaucasia, Central Asia, southern Siberia
- Simyra dentinosa Freyer, 1838 south-eastern Europe, Turkey, Caucasus, Transcaucasia, Lebanon, Syria, Israel, Egypt, Iran
- Simyra albicosta Hampson, 1909 Nilgiri Mountains of India
- Simyra capillata Wallengren, 1875 South Africa
- Simyra confusa (Walker, 1856) Sri Lanka, Arabia
- Simyra conspersa Moore, 1881 Punjab, Sikkim, Bengal
- Simyra renimaculata (Osthelder, 1932) Turkey
- Simyra saepestriata (Alphéraky, 1895) Japan, Korea, Mongolia
- Simyra sincera Warren, 1914
- Simyra splendida Staudinger, 1888 Turkestan, Tibet, southern Siberia, Korea
- Simyra insularis (Herrich-Schäffer, 1868) Ontario, New York, Massachusetts, Kansas, California, New Mexico, Cuba
- Simyra unifacta Dyar, 1912 Mexico
