= Adetaptera maculata =

Scientific classification
- Domain: Eukaryota
- Kingdom: Animalia
- Phylum: Arthropoda
- Class: Insecta
- Order: Coleoptera
- Suborder: Polyphaga
- Infraorder: Cucujiformia
- Family: Cerambycidae
- Genus: Adetaptera
- Species: A. maculata

Binomial name
- Adetaptera maculata (Martins & Galileo, 1999)

Synonyms
- Parmenonta maculata Martins & Galileo, 1999

Species of beetle

Adetaptera maculata is a species of beetle in the family Cerambycidae. It was described by Martins & Galileo in 1999.
