= Arenibacter certesii =

Scientific classification
- Domain: Bacteria
- Kingdom: Pseudomonadati
- Phylum: Bacteroidota
- Class: Flavobacteriia
- Order: Flavobacteriales
- Family: Flavobacteriaceae
- Genus: Arenibacter
- Species: A. certesii

Binomial name
- Arenibacter certesii Nedashkovskaya et al. 2004

Type strain
- KMM 3941, CCUG 48006, DSM 19833, JCM 13507, KCTC 12113

Species of bacterium

Arenibacter certesii is a heterotrophic and aerobic bacterium from the genus of Arenibacter which has been isolated from the green alga Ulva fenestrata from the Sea of Japan.
