= Adetaptera albosticta =

Scientific classification
- Domain: Eukaryota
- Kingdom: Animalia
- Phylum: Arthropoda
- Class: Insecta
- Order: Coleoptera
- Suborder: Polyphaga
- Infraorder: Cucujiformia
- Family: Cerambycidae
- Genus: Adetaptera
- Species: A. albosticta

Binomial name
- Adetaptera albosticta (Galileo & Martins, 2003)

Synonyms
- Parmenonta albosticta Galileo & Martins, 2003

Species of beetle

Adetaptera albosticta is a species of beetle in the family Cerambycidae. It was described by Galileo & Martins in 2003.
