= Morrisia =

Scientific classification
- Domain: Eukaryota
- Kingdom: Animalia
- Phylum: Arthropoda
- Class: Insecta
- Order: Coleoptera
- Suborder: Polyphaga
- Infraorder: Cucujiformia
- Superfamily: Chrysomeloidea
- Family: Cerambycidae
- Subfamily: Lamiinae
- Tribe: Apomecynini
- Genus: Morrisia; Santos-Silva, Nascimento & Wappes, 2019

Genus of beetle

Morrisia is a genus of beetle in the family Cerambycidae. It was described by Santos-Silva, Nascimento & Wappes in 2019. The name is a permanently unavailable junior homonym of Morrisia Davidson, 1852 and will need to be replaced.

== Species ==
- Morrisia pulchra Santos-Silva, Nascimento & Wappes, 2019
- Morrisia squamosa (Chemsak & Noguera, 1993)
