= Adetus punctatus =

Scientific classification
- Kingdom: Animalia
- Phylum: Arthropoda
- Class: Insecta
- Order: Coleoptera
- Suborder: Polyphaga
- Infraorder: Cucujiformia
- Family: Cerambycidae
- Genus: Adetus
- Species: A. punctatus

Binomial name
- Adetus punctatus (Thomson, 1868)

Species of beetle

Adetus punctatus is a species of beetle belonging to the family Cerambycidae. It was described by Thomson in 1868.
