= Arenibacter antarcticus =

Scientific classification
- Domain: Bacteria
- Kingdom: Pseudomonadati
- Phylum: Bacteroidota
- Class: Flavobacteriia
- Order: Flavobacteriales
- Family: Flavobacteriaceae
- Genus: Arenibacter
- Species: A. antarcticus

Binomial name
- Arenibacter antarcticus Li et al. 2017

Type strain
- GDMCC 1.1159, KCTC 52924, R18H21

Species of bacterium

Arenibacter antarcticus is a Gram-negative, strictly aerobic and rod-shaped bacterium from the genus of Arenibacter which has been isolated from sediments the Ross Sea.
