= Adetus nesiotes =

Scientific classification
- Domain: Eukaryota
- Kingdom: Animalia
- Phylum: Arthropoda
- Class: Insecta
- Order: Coleoptera
- Suborder: Polyphaga
- Infraorder: Cucujiformia
- Family: Cerambycidae
- Genus: Adetus
- Species: A. nesiotes

Binomial name
- Adetus nesiotes Linsley & Chemsak, 1966

Species of beetle

Adetus nesiotes is a species of beetle in the family Cerambycidae. It was described by Linsley and Chemsak in 1966.
