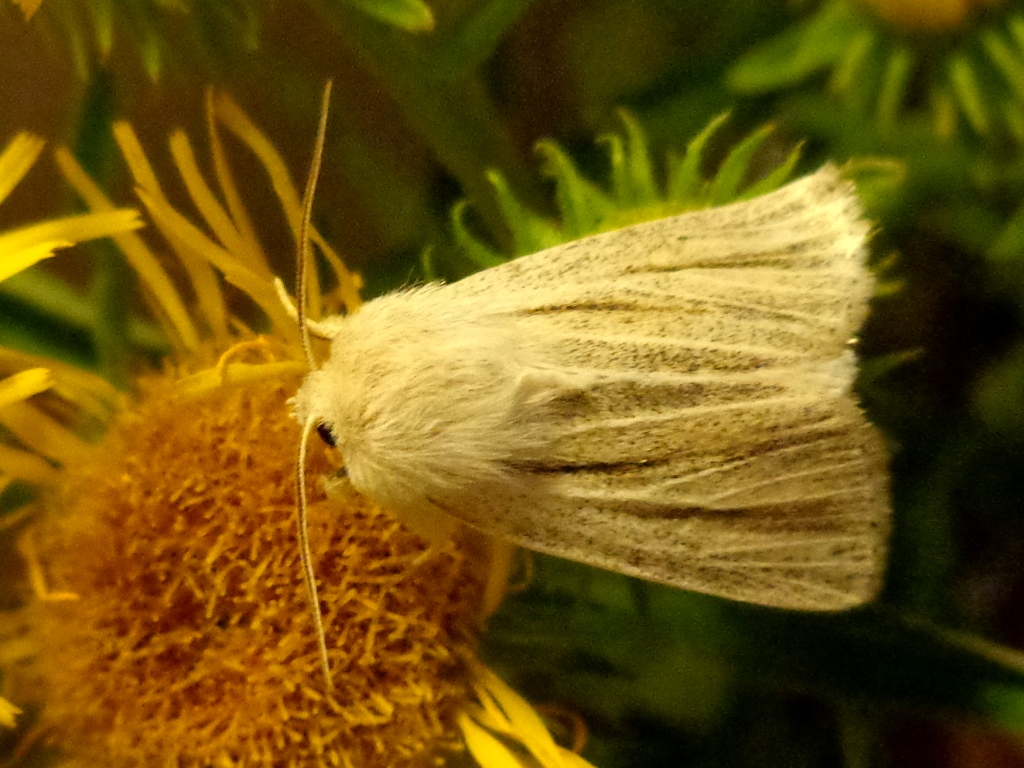

Scientific classification
- Kingdom: Animalia
- Phylum: Arthropoda
- Clade: Pancrustacea
- Class: Insecta
- Order: Lepidoptera
- Superfamily: Noctuoidea
- Family: Noctuidae
- Genus: Simyra
- Species: S. albovenosa

Binomial name
- Simyra albovenosa (Goeze, 1781)

Synonyms
- Phalaena albovenosa Goeze, 1781; Phalaena Noctua albovenosa Goeze, 1781; Phalaena venosa Borkhausen, 1792; Noctua degener Hübner, 1808; Noctua atomina Haworth, 1809; Simyra venosa var. centripuncta Herrich-Schäffer, 1856; Arsilonche albovenosa var. tanaica Alpheraky, 1908; Arsilonche albovenosa cretacea Wagner, 1929; Arsilonche albovenosa f. tjurana Draudt, 1936; Simura albovenosa africana Rungs, 1957

= Simyra albovenosa =

Species of moth

Simyra albovenosa, the reed dagger, is a moth of the family Noctuidae. It is found in most of Europe, then Turkey, Iran, Transcaucasus and into the east Palearctic (Central Asia, Siberia).

The wingspan is 32–40 mm. Forewings whitish-ochreous, sometimes sprinkled with dark fuscous; indistinct brownish median, submedian, and dorsal streaks; sometimes blackish terminal dots. Hindwings white. Larva blackish or dark brown-grey, pale-marbled; subdorsal and subspiracular lines pale ochreous-yellowish, often reddish-marked; tubercles on these yellow or orange; fascicles of pale reddish-brown and black hairs; head black, streaked with ochreous.

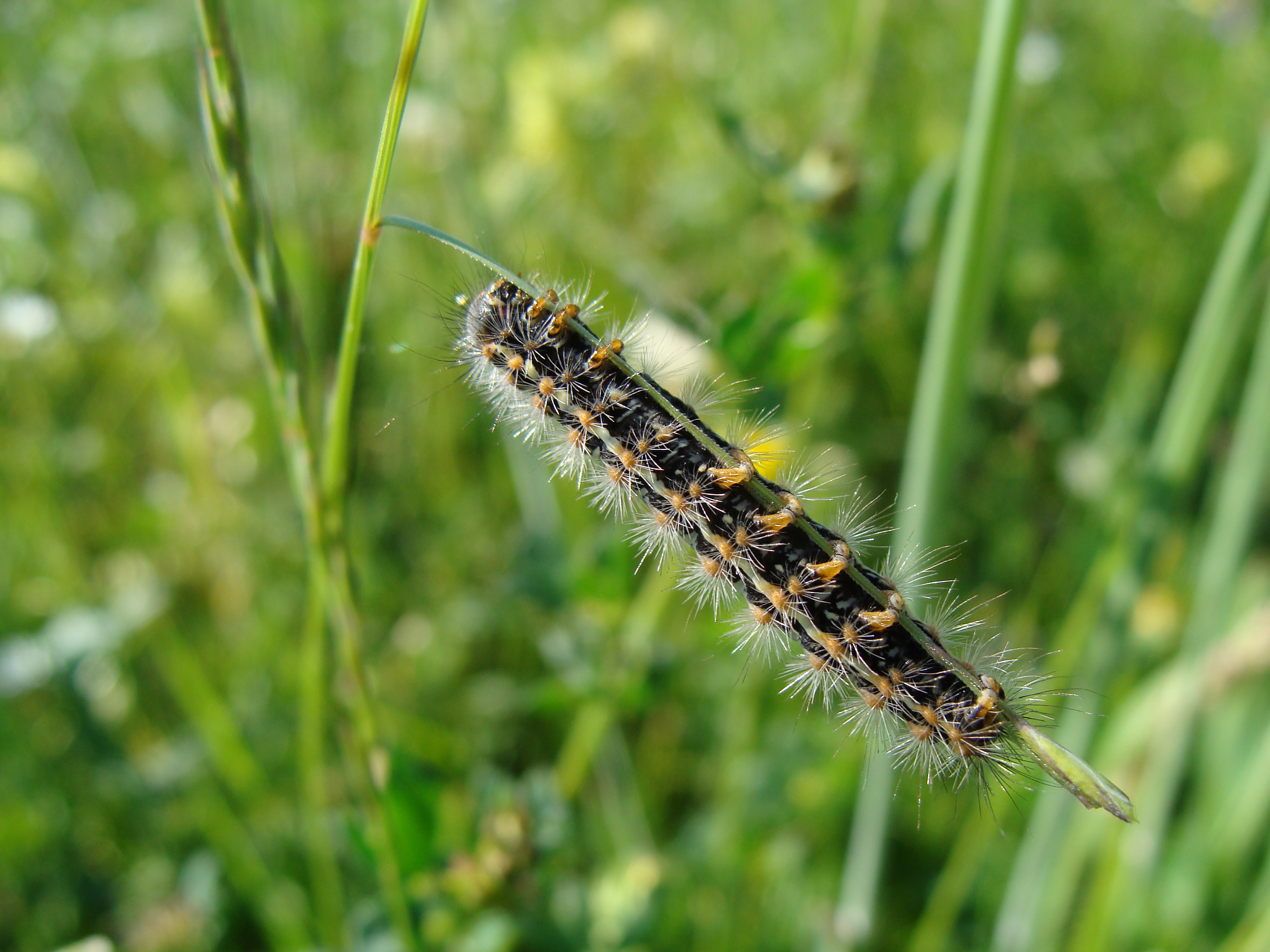
larva

The larvae feed on Typha latifolia, Juncus species, including (Juncus gerardii), Scirpus, Eleocharis palustris, Eriophorum, Elymus arenarius, Phalaris arundinacea, Phragmites communis, Festuca rubra, Festuca arundinacea, Salix, Rumex crispus, Filipendula ulmaria, Potentilla palustris, Angelica archangelica, Sonchus arvensis and Aster tripolium.

S. albovenosa inhabits reed beds and fenland.

Adults are on wing in two generations from April to mid September. Occasionally, a partial third generation occurs in October.
