= Arenibacter nanhaiticus =

Scientific classification
- Domain: Bacteria
- Kingdom: Pseudomonadati
- Phylum: Bacteroidota
- Class: Flavobacteriia
- Order: Flavobacteriales
- Family: Flavobacteriaceae
- Genus: Arenibacter
- Species: A. nanhaiticus

Binomial name
- Arenibacter nanhaiticus Sun et al. 2010

Type strain
- NH36A, CCTCC AB 208315, LMG 24842, MCCC 1A04137

Synonyms
- Arenibacter nantica

Species of bacterium

Arenibacter nanhaiticus is a Gram-negative, rod-shaped and aerobic bacterium from the genus Arenibacter which has been isolated from sandy sediments from the South China Sea.
