= Adetus stellatus =

Scientific classification
- Domain: Eukaryota
- Kingdom: Animalia
- Phylum: Arthropoda
- Class: Insecta
- Order: Coleoptera
- Suborder: Polyphaga
- Infraorder: Cucujiformia
- Family: Cerambycidae
- Genus: Adetus
- Species: A. stellatus

Binomial name
- Adetus stellatus Martins & Galileo, 2008

Species of beetle

Adetus stellatus is a species of beetle in the family Cerambycidae. It was described by Martins and Galileo in 2008.
