= Adetus mucoreus =

Scientific classification
- Domain: Eukaryota
- Kingdom: Animalia
- Phylum: Arthropoda
- Class: Insecta
- Order: Coleoptera
- Suborder: Polyphaga
- Infraorder: Cucujiformia
- Family: Cerambycidae
- Genus: Adetus
- Species: A. mucoreus

Binomial name
- Adetus mucoreus Bates, 1885

Species of beetle

Adetus mucoreus is a species of beetle in the family Cerambycidae. It was described by Henry Walter Bates in 1885.
