= Adetaptera punctigera =

Scientific classification
- Domain: Eukaryota
- Kingdom: Animalia
- Phylum: Arthropoda
- Class: Insecta
- Order: Coleoptera
- Suborder: Polyphaga
- Infraorder: Cucujiformia
- Family: Cerambycidae
- Genus: Adetaptera
- Species: A. punctigera

Binomial name
- Adetaptera punctigera (Germar, 1824)

Synonyms
- Saperda punctigera Germar, 1824; Parmenonta punctigera (Germar, 1824)

Species of beetle

Adetaptera punctigera is a species of beetle in the family Cerambycidae. It was described by Ernst Friedrich Germar in 1824.
