= Adetus aberrans =

Scientific classification
- Domain: Eukaryota
- Kingdom: Animalia
- Phylum: Arthropoda
- Class: Insecta
- Order: Coleoptera
- Suborder: Polyphaga
- Infraorder: Cucujiformia
- Family: Cerambycidae
- Genus: Adetus
- Species: A. aberrans

Binomial name
- Adetus aberrans Galileo & Martins, 2003

Species of beetle

Adetus aberrans is a species of beetle in the family Cerambycidae. It was described by Galileo and Martins in 2003.
