= Adetus nanus =

Scientific classification
- Kingdom: Animalia
- Phylum: Arthropoda
- Class: Insecta
- Order: Coleoptera
- Suborder: Polyphaga
- Infraorder: Cucujiformia
- Family: Cerambycidae
- Genus: Adetus
- Species: A. nanus

Binomial name
- Adetus nanus (Fairmaire & Germain, 1859)

Species of beetle

Adetus nanus is a species of beetle in the family Cerambycidae. It was described by Fairmaire and Germain in 1859.
