= Adetus flavescens =

Scientific classification
- Kingdom: Animalia
- Phylum: Arthropoda
- Class: Insecta
- Order: Coleoptera
- Suborder: Polyphaga
- Infraorder: Cucujiformia
- Family: Cerambycidae
- Genus: Adetus
- Species: A. flavescens

Binomial name
- Adetus flavescens Melzer, 1934

Species of beetle

Adetus flavescens is a species of beetle in the family Cerambycidae. It was described by Melzer in 1934.
