= Arenibacter palladensis =

Scientific classification
- Domain: Bacteria
- Kingdom: Pseudomonadati
- Phylum: Bacteroidota
- Class: Flavobacteriia
- Order: Flavobacteriales
- Family: Flavobacteriaceae
- Genus: Arenibacter
- Species: A. palladensis

Binomial name
- Arenibacter palladensis Nedashkovskaya et al. 2006

Type strain
- CIP 108849, DSM 17539, JCM 13509, KMM 3961, LMG 21972

Synonyms
- Pibocella ulvae

Species of bacterium

Arenibacter palladensis is a heterotrophic and aerobic bacterium from the genus Arenibacter which has been isolated from the green alga Ulva fenestrata in the Sea of Japan.
