= Adetus lherminieri =

Scientific classification
- Kingdom: Animalia
- Phylum: Arthropoda
- Class: Insecta
- Order: Coleoptera
- Suborder: Polyphaga
- Infraorder: Cucujiformia
- Family: Cerambycidae
- Genus: Adetus
- Species: A. lherminieri

Binomial name
- Adetus lherminieri Fleutiaux & Sallé, 1889

Species of beetle

Adetus lherminieri is a species of beetle in the family Cerambycidae. It was described by Fleutiaux and Sallé in 1889.
