= Adetus spinipennis =

Scientific classification
- Kingdom: Animalia
- Phylum: Arthropoda
- Class: Insecta
- Order: Coleoptera
- Suborder: Polyphaga
- Infraorder: Cucujiformia
- Family: Cerambycidae
- Genus: Adetus
- Species: A. spinipennis

Binomial name
- Adetus spinipennis Breuning, 1971

Species of beetle

Adetus spinipennis is a species of beetle in the family Cerambycidae. It was described by Stephan von Breuning in 1971.
