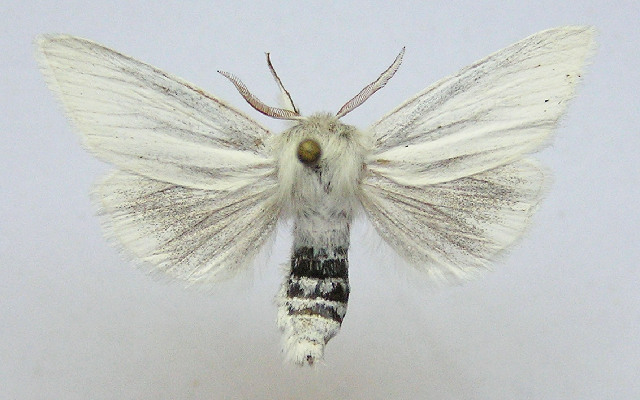

Scientific classification
- Domain: Eukaryota
- Kingdom: Animalia
- Phylum: Arthropoda
- Class: Insecta
- Order: Lepidoptera
- Superfamily: Noctuoidea
- Family: Noctuidae
- Genus: Simyra
- Species: S. splendida

Binomial name
- Simyra splendida Staudinger, 1888

= Simyra splendida =

Species of moth

Simyra splendida is a moth of the family Noctuidae. It is found in central Asia, from China to Tibet, Mongolia, the Korean Peninsula, the Russian Far East (Primorye, Amur region), southern Kazakhstan and southern Siberia (Transbaikalia).
