= Aponia minnithalis =

Scientific classification
- Domain: Eukaryota
- Kingdom: Animalia
- Phylum: Arthropoda
- Class: Insecta
- Order: Lepidoptera
- Family: Crambidae
- Genus: Aponia
- Species: A. minnithalis

Binomial name
- Aponia minnithalis (Druce, 1895)

Synonyms
- Sathria minnithalis Druce, 1895

Species of moth

Aponia minnithalis is a moth in the family Crambidae. It was described by Druce in 1895. It is found in Guatemala and Panama.
