= Arenibacter algicola =

Scientific classification
- Domain: Bacteria
- Kingdom: Pseudomonadati
- Phylum: Bacteroidota
- Class: Flavobacteriia
- Order: Flavobacteriales
- Family: Flavobacteriaceae
- Genus: Arenibacter
- Species: A. algicola

Binomial name
- Arenibacter algicola Gutierrez et al. 2014

Type strain
- ATCC BAA-2265, TG409, DSM 24761

Species of bacterium

Arenibacter algicola is a Gram-negative, hydrocarbon-degrading and strictly aerobic bacterium from the genus Arenibacter. Arenibacter algicola uses polycyclic aromatic hydrocarbons as only sources fore carbon and energy.
