= Arenibacter echinorum =

Scientific classification
- Domain: Bacteria
- Kingdom: Pseudomonadati
- Phylum: Bacteroidota
- Class: Flavobacteriia
- Order: Flavobacteriales
- Family: Flavobacteriaceae
- Genus: Arenibacter
- Species: A. echinorum

Binomial name
- Arenibacter echinorum Nedashkovskaya et al. 2007

Type strain
- DSM 23522, KCTC 22013, KMM 6032, LMG 22574

Species of bacterium

Arenibacter echinorum is a heterotrophic and aerobic bacterium from the genus Arenibacter which has been isolated from the sea urchin Strongylocentrotus intermedius from the Sea of Japan.
