= Adetaptera thomasi =

Scientific classification
- Domain: Eukaryota
- Kingdom: Animalia
- Phylum: Arthropoda
- Class: Insecta
- Order: Coleoptera
- Suborder: Polyphaga
- Infraorder: Cucujiformia
- Family: Cerambycidae
- Genus: Adetaptera
- Species: A. thomasi

Binomial name
- Adetaptera thomasi (Linsley & Chemsak, 1984)

Synonyms
- Parmenonta thomasi Linsley & Chemsak, 1984

Species of beetle

Adetaptera thomasi is a species of beetle in the family Cerambycidae. It was described by Linsley and Chemsak in 1984.
