= Adetus stramentosus =

Scientific classification
- Kingdom: Animalia
- Phylum: Arthropoda
- Class: Insecta
- Order: Coleoptera
- Suborder: Polyphaga
- Infraorder: Cucujiformia
- Family: Cerambycidae
- Genus: Adetus
- Species: A. stramentosus

Binomial name
- Adetus stramentosus Breuning, 1940

Species of beetle

Adetus stramentosus is a species of beetle in the family Cerambycidae. It was described by Stephan von Breuning in 1940.
