= Adetus vanduzeei =

Scientific classification
- Domain: Eukaryota
- Kingdom: Animalia
- Phylum: Arthropoda
- Class: Insecta
- Order: Coleoptera
- Suborder: Polyphaga
- Infraorder: Cucujiformia
- Family: Cerambycidae
- Genus: Adetus
- Species: A. vanduzeei

Binomial name
- Adetus vanduzeei Linsley, 1934

Species of beetle

Adetus vanduzeei is a species of beetle in the family Cerambycidae. It was described by Linsley in 1934.
