= Adetaptera parallela =

Scientific classification
- Domain: Eukaryota
- Kingdom: Animalia
- Phylum: Arthropoda
- Class: Insecta
- Order: Coleoptera
- Suborder: Polyphaga
- Infraorder: Cucujiformia
- Family: Cerambycidae
- Genus: Adetaptera
- Species: A. parallela

Binomial name
- Adetaptera parallela (Lameere, 1893)

Synonyms
- Parmenonta parallela Lameere, 1893

Species of beetle

Adetaptera parallela is a species of beetle in the family Cerambycidae. It was described by Lameere in 1893.
