= Adetus irregularis =

Scientific classification
- Kingdom: Animalia
- Phylum: Arthropoda
- Class: Insecta
- Order: Coleoptera
- Suborder: Polyphaga
- Infraorder: Cucujiformia
- Family: Cerambycidae
- Genus: Adetus
- Species: A. irregularis

Binomial name
- Adetus irregularis (Breuning, 1939)

Species of beetle

Adetus irregularis is a species of beetle in the family Cerambycidae. It was described by Breuning in 1939.
