= Adetaptera dominicana =

Scientific classification
- Domain: Eukaryota
- Kingdom: Animalia
- Phylum: Arthropoda
- Class: Insecta
- Order: Coleoptera
- Suborder: Polyphaga
- Infraorder: Cucujiformia
- Family: Cerambycidae
- Genus: Adetaptera
- Species: A. dominicana

Binomial name
- Adetaptera dominicana (Galileo & Martins, 2004)

Synonyms
- Parmenonta dominicana Galileo & Martins, 2004

Species of beetle

Adetaptera dominicana is a species of beetle in the family Cerambycidae. It was described by Galileo & Martins in 2004.
