= Arenibacter =

Scientific classification
- Domain: Bacteria
- Kingdom: Pseudomonadati
- Phylum: Bacteroidota
- Class: Flavobacteriia
- Order: Flavobacteriales
- Family: Flavobacteriaceae
- Genus: Arenibacter; Ivanova et al. 2001

Type species
- Arenibacter latericius

Species
- A. antarcticus A. algicola A. catalasegens A. certesii A. echinorum A. hampyeongensis A. latericius A. nanhaiticus A. palladensis A. troitsensis

Genus of bacteria

Arenibacter is a rod-shaped and strictly aerobic genus from the family of Flavobacteriaceae.
