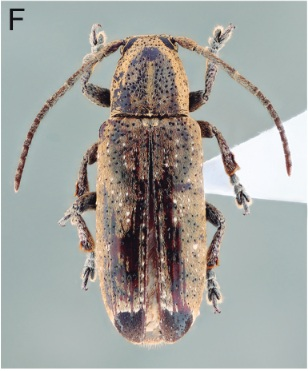

Scientific classification
- Kingdom: Animalia
- Phylum: Arthropoda
- Clade: Pancrustacea
- Class: Insecta
- Order: Coleoptera
- Suborder: Polyphaga
- Infraorder: Cucujiformia
- Family: Cerambycidae
- Genus: Adetus
- Species: A. analis

Binomial name
- Adetus analis (Haldeman, 1847)

Synonyms
- Polyopsia analis Haldeman, 1847; Agennopsis mutica Thomson, 1857; Agennopsis pygaea Bates, 1866b; Agennopsis mexicana Thomson, 1868

= Adetus analis =

Species of beetle

Adetus analis is a species of beetle in the family Cerambycidae. It was described by Haldeman in 1847. It is found in Mexico, Honduras, Nicaragua, Costa Rica, Panama, Colombia, Venezuela, Peru, Bolivia, French Guiana, Brazil and Argentina.
