= Anatinomma brevicornis =

Scientific classification
- Kingdom: Animalia
- Phylum: Arthropoda
- Class: Insecta
- Order: Coleoptera
- Suborder: Polyphaga
- Infraorder: Cucujiformia
- Family: Cerambycidae
- Genus: Anatinomma
- Species: A. brevicornis

Binomial name
- Anatinomma brevicornis Fisher, 1944

Species of beetle

Anatinomma brevicornis is a species of beetle in the family Cerambycidae. It was described by Fisher in 1944.
