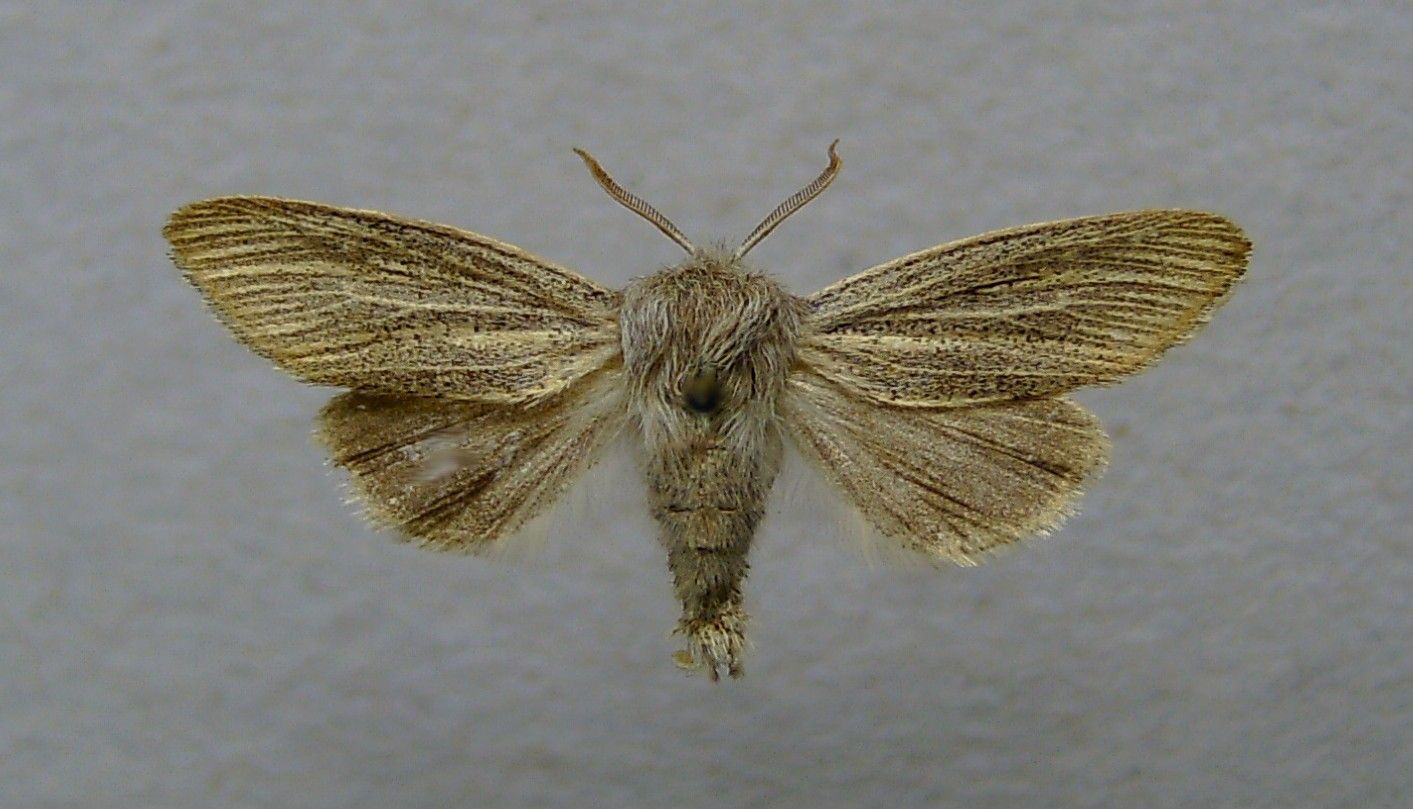

Scientific classification
- Kingdom: Animalia
- Phylum: Arthropoda
- Clade: Pancrustacea
- Class: Insecta
- Order: Lepidoptera
- Superfamily: Noctuoidea
- Family: Noctuidae
- Genus: Simyra
- Species: S. nervosa

Binomial name
- Simyra nervosa (Denis & Schiffermüller, 1775)

Synonyms
- Noctua nervosa Denis & Schiffermüller, 1775; Phalaena (Noctua) oxyptera Esper, 1788; Phalaena (Noctua) oxyptera Esper, 1796; Simyra argentacea Herrich-Schäffer, 1848; Simyra torosa Guenée, 1852; Simyra nervosa var. expressa Bang-Haas, 1912

= Simyra nervosa =

Species of moth

Simyra nervosa is a moth of the family Noctuidae. In Europe, it is found from France, east through north and north-eastern Germany to Poland. South of the Alps it is found from northern Italy, through the Balkan countries to Greece. There is an isolated population in Sicily. In Asia, it is found in Anatolia, the Caucasus, Iran, Afghanistan, Siberia, Tibet, Mongolia and China.

The wingspan is 28–34 mm. Adults are on wing in two generations from April to May and from July to August.

The larvae feed on Euphorbia esula, Rumex acetosella and Hieracium umbellatum.
