= Arenibacter catalasegens =

Scientific classification
- Domain: Bacteria
- Kingdom: Pseudomonadati
- Phylum: Bacteroidota
- Class: Flavobacteriia
- Order: Flavobacteriales
- Family: Flavobacteriaceae
- Genus: Arenibacter
- Species: A. catalasegens

Binomial name
- Arenibacter catalasegens Li et al. 2018

Type strain
- GDMCC 1.1230, KCTC 52983, P308H10

Species of bacterium

Arenibacter catalasegens is a Gram-negative, aerobic, rod-shaped and non-motile bacterium from the genus of Arenibacter which has been isolated from surface sediments from the Southern Indian Ocean.
