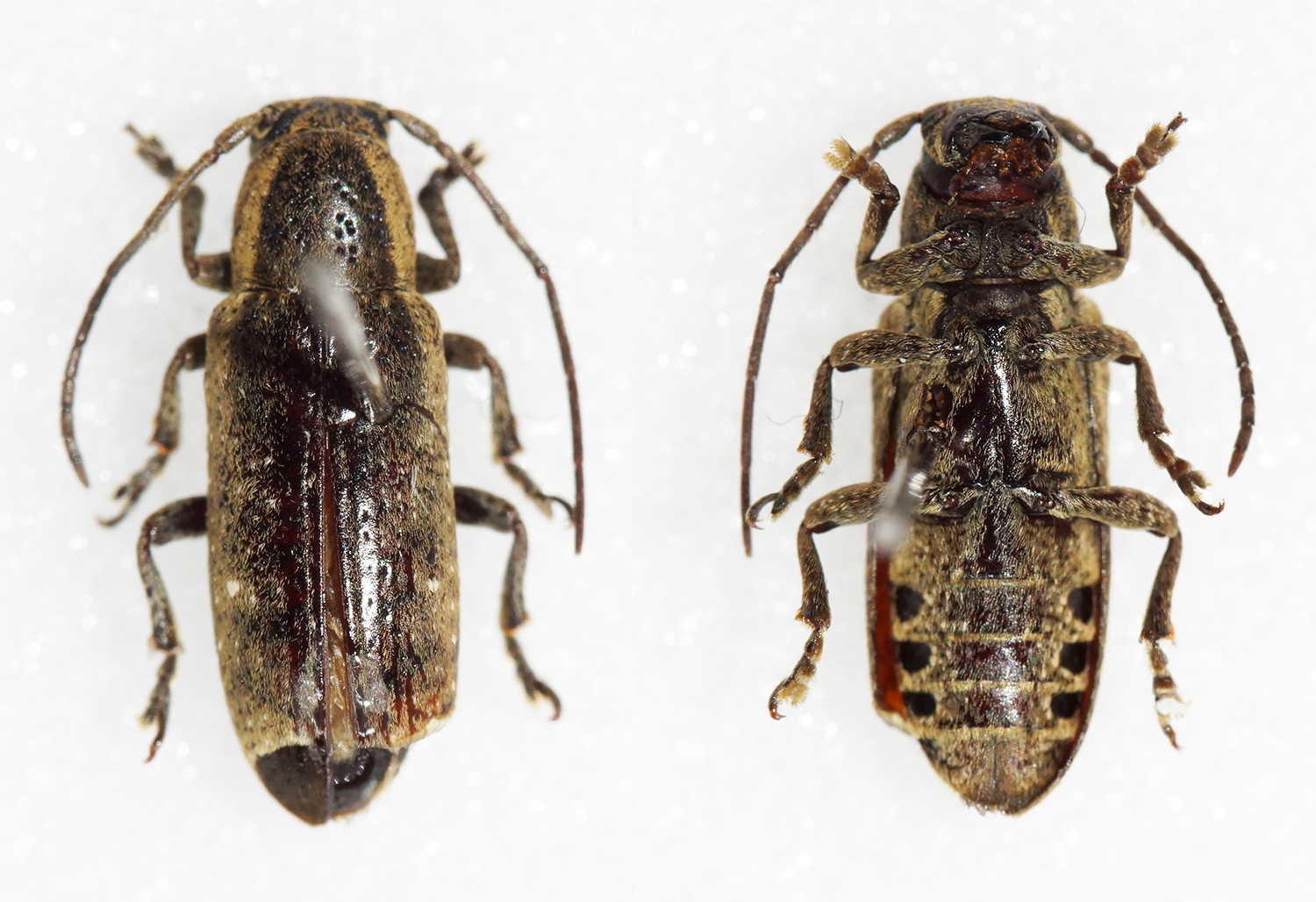

Scientific classification
- Domain: Eukaryota
- Kingdom: Animalia
- Phylum: Arthropoda
- Class: Insecta
- Order: Coleoptera
- Suborder: Polyphaga
- Infraorder: Cucujiformia
- Family: Cerambycidae
- Genus: Adetus
- Species: A. similis

Binomial name
- Adetus similis Bruch, 1939

= Adetus similis =

Species of beetle

Adetus similis is a species of beetle in the family Cerambycidae. It was described by Bruch in 1939.
