= Adetus brasiliensis =

Scientific classification
- Kingdom: Animalia
- Phylum: Arthropoda
- Clade: Pancrustacea
- Class: Insecta
- Order: Coleoptera
- Suborder: Polyphaga
- Infraorder: Cucujiformia
- Family: Cerambycidae
- Genus: Adetus
- Species: A. brasiliensis

Binomial name
- Adetus brasiliensis (Melzer, 1923)

Species of beetle

Adetus brasiliensis is a species of beetle in the family Cerambycidae. It was described by Melzer in 1923.
