= Aponia aponianalis =

Scientific classification
- Domain: Eukaryota
- Kingdom: Animalia
- Phylum: Arthropoda
- Class: Insecta
- Order: Lepidoptera
- Family: Crambidae
- Genus: Aponia
- Species: A. aponianalis

Binomial name
- Aponia aponianalis (H. Druce, 1899)

Synonyms
- Pionea aponianalis H. Druce, 1899

Species of moth

Aponia aponianalis is a moth in the family Crambidae. It was described by Herbert Druce in 1899. It is found in Mexico.
