= Simyra confusa =

Scientific classification
- Kingdom: Animalia
- Phylum: Arthropoda
- Class: Insecta
- Order: Lepidoptera
- Superfamily: Noctuoidea
- Family: Noctuidae
- Genus: Simyra
- Species: S. confusa

Binomial name
- Simyra confusa Walker, 1856

Species of moth

Simyra confusa is a moth of the family Noctuidae first described by Francis Walker in 1856. It is found in Sri Lanka.
