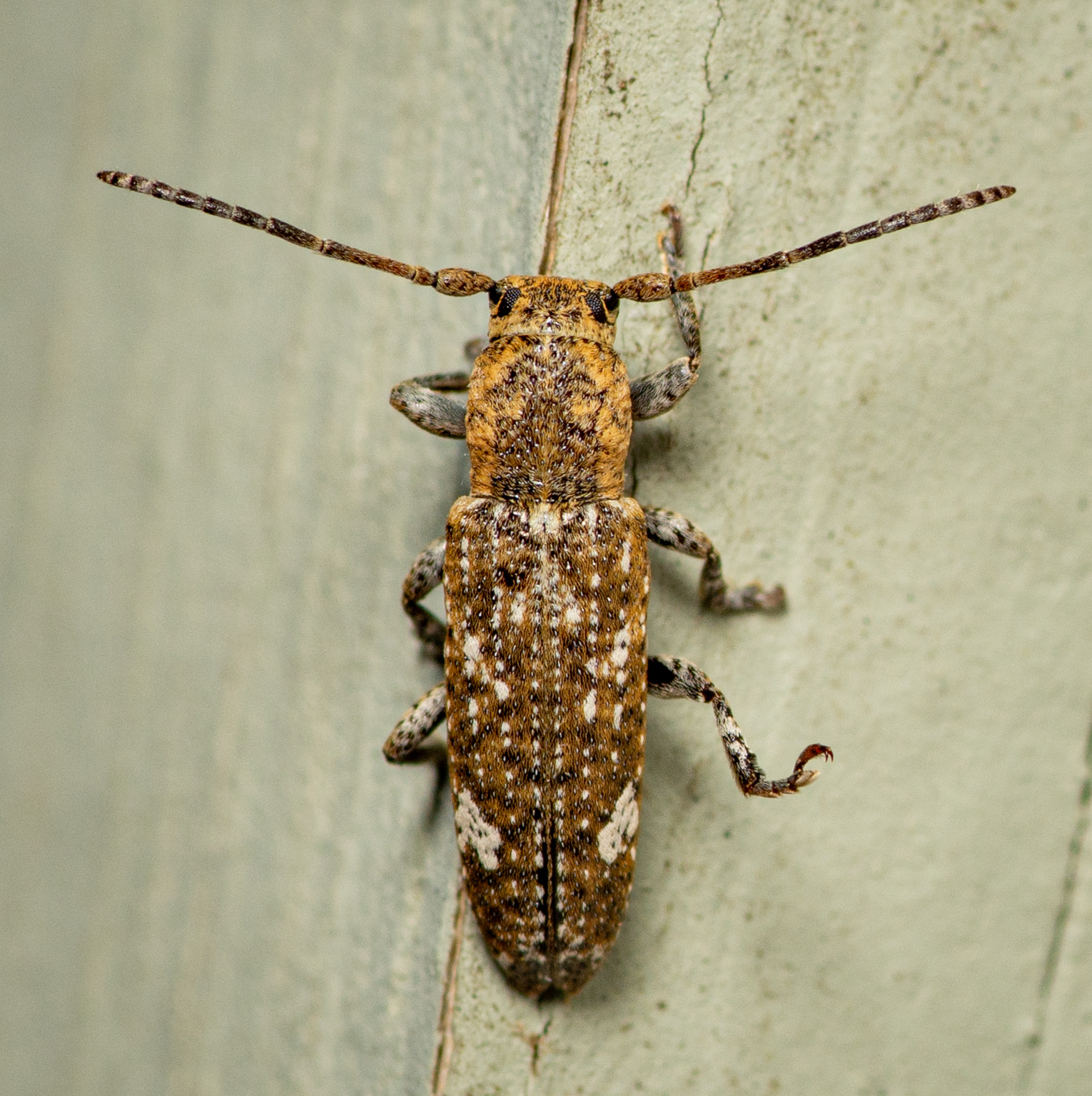

Scientific classification
- Domain: Eukaryota
- Kingdom: Animalia
- Phylum: Arthropoda
- Class: Insecta
- Order: Coleoptera
- Suborder: Polyphaga
- Infraorder: Cucujiformia
- Family: Cerambycidae
- Genus: Adetus
- Species: A. brousi

Binomial name
- Adetus brousi (Horn, 1880)

= Adetus brousi =

Species of beetle

Adetus brousi is a species of beetle in the family Cerambycidae. It was described by George Henry Horn in 1880.
