= Arenibacter troitsensis =

Scientific classification
- Domain: Bacteria
- Kingdom: Pseudomonadati
- Phylum: Bacteroidota
- Class: Flavobacteriia
- Order: Flavobacteriales
- Family: Flavobacteriaceae
- Genus: Arenibacter
- Species: A. troitsensis

Binomial name
- Arenibacter troitsensis Nedashkovskaya et al. 2003

Type strain
- DSM 19835, JCM 11736, KMM 3674, NBRC 101532

Synonyms
- Arenibacter trinitatis

Species of bacterium

Arenibacter troitsensis is a heterotrophic, aerobic and non-motile bacterium from the genus Arenibacter which has been isolated from marine bottom sediments from the Gulf of Peter the Great in the Sea of Japan.
