= Adetaptera =

Scientific classification
- Domain: Eukaryota
- Kingdom: Animalia
- Phylum: Arthropoda
- Class: Insecta
- Order: Coleoptera
- Suborder: Polyphaga
- Infraorder: Cucujiformia
- Family: Cerambycidae
- Tribe: Apomecynini
- Genus: Adetaptera; Santos-Silva, Nascimento & Wappes, 2019

Genus of beetles

Adetaptera is a genus of beetles in the family Cerambycidae, most of which were formerly in the genus Parmenonta.

== Species ==
- Adetaptera albisetosa (Bates, 1880)
- Adetaptera albosticta (Galileo & Martins, 2003)
- Adetaptera chapadensis (Martins & Galileo, 1999)
- Adetaptera dominicana (Galileo & Martins, 2004)
- Adetaptera fulvosticta (Bates, 1885)
- Adetaptera insularis (Fisher, 1930)
- Adetaptera laevepunctata (Breuning, 1940)
- Adetaptera lenticula (Galileo & Martins, 2006)
- Adetaptera maculata (Martins & Galileo, 1999)
- Adetaptera minor (Bates, 1880)
- Adetaptera ovatula (Bates, 1880)
- Adetaptera parallela (Lameere, 1893)
- Adetaptera punctigera (Germar, 1824)
- Adetaptera schaffneri Santos-Silva, Nascimento & Wappes, 2019
- Adetaptera strandiella (Breuning, 1940)
- Adetaptera thomasi (Linsley & Chemsak, 1984)
- Adetaptera wickhami (Schaeffer, 1908)
