= Anatinomma =

Scientific classification
- Kingdom: Animalia
- Phylum: Arthropoda
- Class: Insecta
- Order: Coleoptera
- Suborder: Polyphaga
- Infraorder: Cucujiformia
- Family: Cerambycidae
- Subfamily: Cerambycinae
- Tribe: Hesperophanini
- Genus: Anatinomma; Bates, 1892

Genus of beetles

Anatinomma is a genus of beetles in the family Cerambycidae, containing the following species:

- Anatinomma alveolatum Bates, 1892
- Anatinomma bispinosum Aurivillius, 1916
- Anatinomma brevicornis Fisher, 1944
- Anatinomma insularis Chemsak & Linsley, 1964
