= Arenibacter hampyeongensis =

Scientific classification
- Domain: Bacteria
- Kingdom: Pseudomonadati
- Phylum: Bacteroidota
- Class: Flavobacteriia
- Order: Flavobacteriales
- Family: Flavobacteriaceae
- Genus: Arenibacter
- Species: A. hampyeongensis

Binomial name
- Arenibacter hampyeongensis Jeong et al. 2013

Type strain
- DSM 23522, KCTC 22013, KMM 6032, LMG 22574

Species of bacterium

Arenibacter hampyeongensis is a Gram-negative, strictly aerobic bacterium from the genus Arenibacter which has been isolated from tidal flat from Hampyeong in Korea.
