= Adetaptera albisetosa =

Scientific classification
- Domain: Eukaryota
- Kingdom: Animalia
- Phylum: Arthropoda
- Class: Insecta
- Order: Coleoptera
- Suborder: Polyphaga
- Infraorder: Cucujiformia
- Family: Cerambycidae
- Genus: Adetaptera
- Species: A. albisetosa

Binomial name
- Adetaptera albisetosa (Bates, 1880)

Synonyms
- Parmenonta albisetosa Bates, 1880

Species of beetle

Adetaptera albisetosa is a species of beetle in the family Cerambycidae. It was described by Henry Walter Bates in 1880.
