= Aponia major =

Scientific classification
- Domain: Eukaryota
- Kingdom: Animalia
- Phylum: Arthropoda
- Class: Insecta
- Order: Lepidoptera
- Family: Crambidae
- Genus: Aponia
- Species: A. major

Binomial name
- Aponia major Munroe, 1964

Species of moth

Aponia major is a moth in the family Crambidae. It was described by Eugene G. Munroe in 1964. It is found in Nicaragua.
