= Aponia (moth) =

Scientific classification
- Domain: Eukaryota
- Kingdom: Animalia
- Phylum: Arthropoda
- Class: Insecta
- Order: Lepidoptera
- Family: Crambidae
- Subfamily: Pyraustinae
- Genus: Aponia; Munroe, 1964

Genus of moths

Aponia is a genus of moths of the family Crambidae.

== Species ==
- Aponia aponianalis (Druce, 1899)
- Aponia insularis Munroe, 1964
- Aponia itzalis Munroe, 1964
- Aponia major Munroe, 1964
- Aponia minnithalis (Druce, 1895)
