= Adetaptera laevepunctata =

Scientific classification
- Kingdom: Animalia
- Phylum: Arthropoda
- Class: Insecta
- Order: Coleoptera
- Suborder: Polyphaga
- Infraorder: Cucujiformia
- Family: Cerambycidae
- Genus: Adetaptera
- Species: A. laevepunctata

Binomial name
- Adetaptera laevepunctata (Breuning, 1940)

Synonyms
- Parmenonta laevepunctata Breuning, 1940

Species of beetle

Adetaptera laevepunctata is a species of beetle in the family Cerambycidae. It was described by Breuning in 1940.
