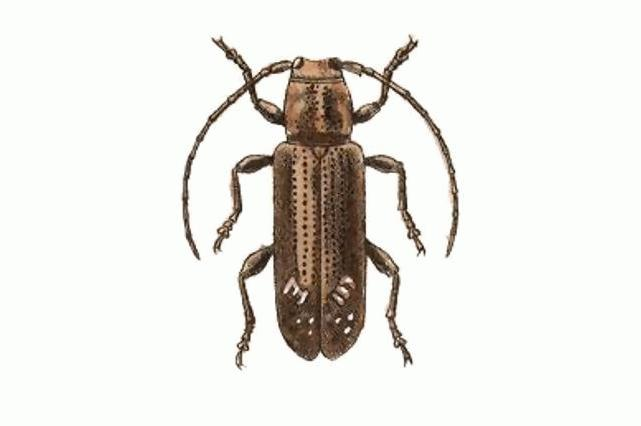
- Adetus validus

Scientific classification
- Kingdom: Animalia
- Phylum: Arthropoda
- Class: Insecta
- Order: Coleoptera
- Suborder: Polyphaga
- Infraorder: Cucujiformia
- Family: Cerambycidae
- Genus: Adetus
- Species: A. validus

Binomial name
- Adetus validus (Thomson, 1868)

Synonyms
- Parmenonta valida Thomson, 1868

= Adetus validus =

Species of beetle

Adetus validus is a species of beetle in the family Cerambycidae. It was described by Thomson in 1868.
