= Adetus sordidus =

Scientific classification
- Domain: Eukaryota
- Kingdom: Animalia
- Phylum: Arthropoda
- Class: Insecta
- Order: Coleoptera
- Suborder: Polyphaga
- Infraorder: Cucujiformia
- Family: Cerambycidae
- Genus: Adetus
- Species: A. sordidus

Binomial name
- Adetus sordidus (Bates, 1866)

Species of beetle

Adetus sordidus is a species of beetle in the family Cerambycidae. It was described by Henry Walter Bates in 1866.
