= Adetus fuscopunctatus =

Scientific classification
- Domain: Eukaryota
- Kingdom: Animalia
- Phylum: Arthropoda
- Class: Insecta
- Order: Coleoptera
- Suborder: Polyphaga
- Infraorder: Cucujiformia
- Family: Cerambycidae
- Genus: Adetus
- Species: A. fuscopunctatus

Binomial name
- Adetus fuscopunctatus Aurivillius, 1900

Species of beetle

Adetus fuscopunctatus is a species of beetle in the family Cerambycidae. It was described by Per Olof Christopher Aurivillius in 1900.
