= Adetus binotatus =

Scientific classification
- Domain: Eukaryota
- Kingdom: Animalia
- Phylum: Arthropoda
- Class: Insecta
- Order: Coleoptera
- Suborder: Polyphaga
- Infraorder: Cucujiformia
- Family: Cerambycidae
- Genus: Adetus
- Species: A. binotatus

Binomial name
- Adetus binotatus (Thomson, 1868)

Species of beetle

Adetus binotatus is a species of beetle in the family Cerambycidae. It was described by Thomson in 1868.
