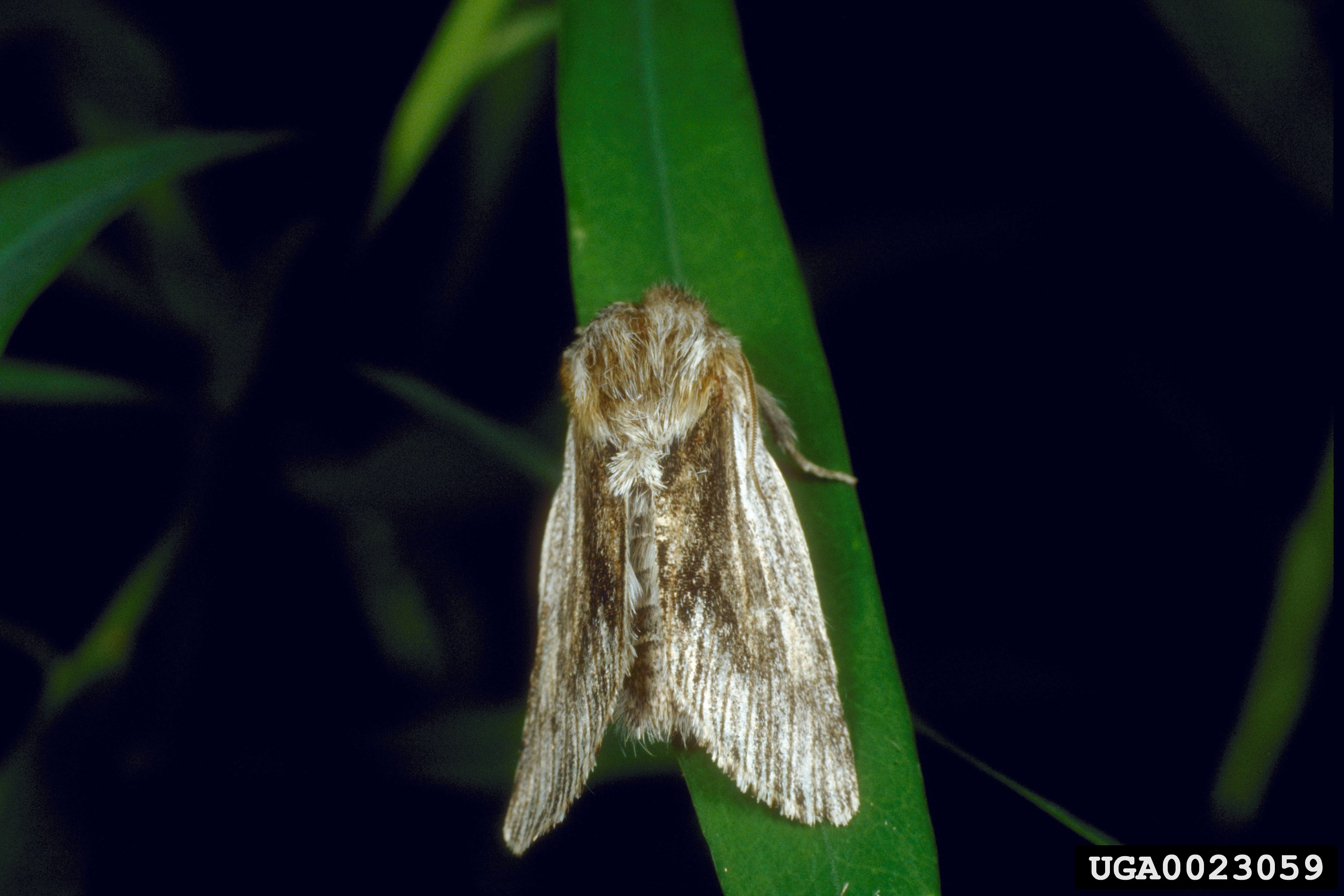
- Adult
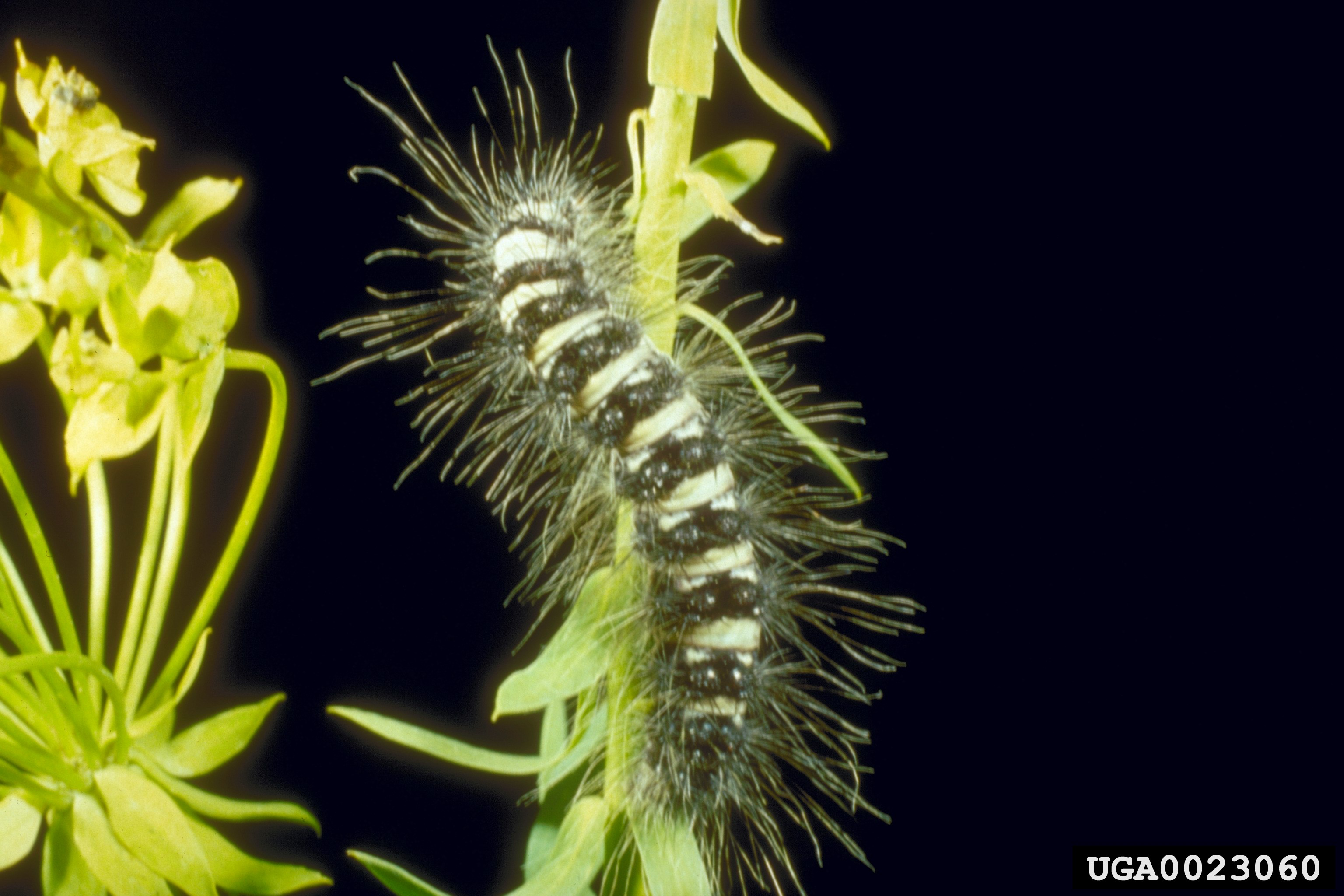
- Larva

Scientific classification
- Domain: Eukaryota
- Kingdom: Animalia
- Phylum: Arthropoda
- Class: Insecta
- Order: Lepidoptera
- Superfamily: Noctuoidea
- Family: Noctuidae
- Genus: Simyra
- Species: S. dentinosa

Binomial name
- Simyra dentinosa Freyer, 1838

Synonyms
- Cucullia leucaspis Fischer de Waldheim, 1840; Simyra tendinosa Herrich-Schäffer, 1848

= Simyra dentinosa =

Species of moth

Simyra dentinosa is a moth of the family Noctuidae. It is found in south-eastern Caspian, Balkans, southern part of Eastern Europe, the Near East and Middle East. It has been introduced in the United States.

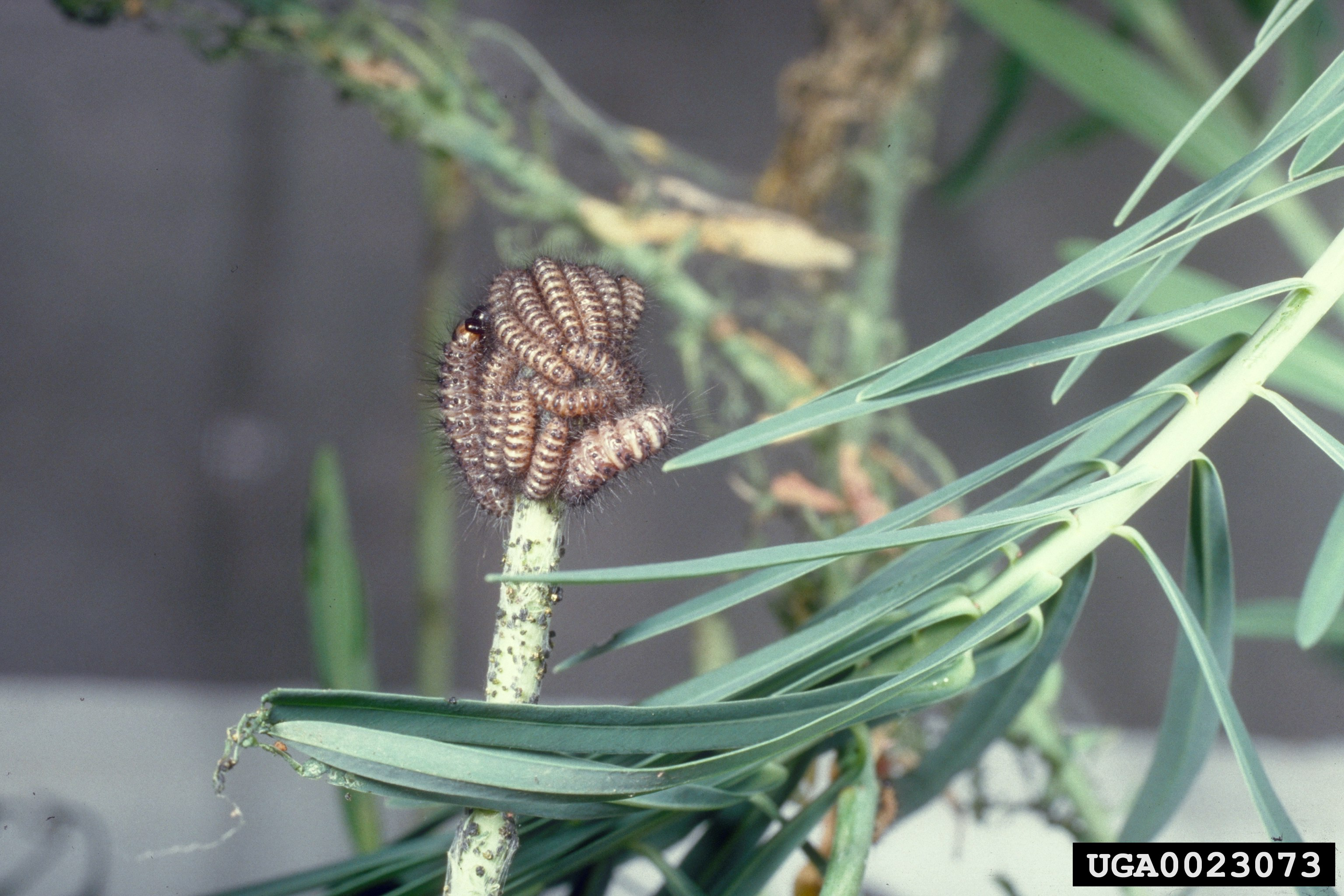
Larvae

Adults are on wing from January to March. There is one generation per year.

The larvae feed on Euphorbia species.
