= Adetaptera fulvosticta =

Scientific classification
- Domain: Eukaryota
- Kingdom: Animalia
- Phylum: Arthropoda
- Class: Insecta
- Order: Coleoptera
- Suborder: Polyphaga
- Infraorder: Cucujiformia
- Family: Cerambycidae
- Genus: Adetaptera
- Species: A. fulvosticta

Binomial name
- Adetaptera fulvosticta (Bates, 1885)

Synonyms
- Parmenonta fulvosticta Bates, 1885

Species of beetle

Adetaptera fulvosticta is a species of beetle in the family Cerambycidae. It was described by Henry Walter Bates in 1885.
