= Adetus obliquus =

Scientific classification
- Domain: Eukaryota
- Kingdom: Animalia
- Phylum: Arthropoda
- Class: Insecta
- Order: Coleoptera
- Suborder: Polyphaga
- Infraorder: Cucujiformia
- Family: Cerambycidae
- Genus: Adetus
- Species: A. obliquus

Binomial name
- Adetus obliquus (Bates, 1885)

Species of beetle

Adetus obliquus is a species of beetle in the family Cerambycidae. It was described by Henry Walter Bates in 1885.

Adetus obliquus is a type of Lamiinae, or flat-faced longhorned beetle. The type specimen used for its original description was from Neotropical Mexico. Adetus obliquus belongs to the Adetus genus within the Apomecynini tribe of Lamiinae.
