= Arenibacter latericius =

Scientific classification
- Domain: Bacteria
- Kingdom: Pseudomonadati
- Phylum: Bacteroidota
- Class: Flavobacteriia
- Order: Flavobacteriales
- Family: Flavobacteriaceae
- Genus: Arenibacter
- Species: A. latericius

Binomial name
- Arenibacter latericius Ivanova et al. 2001

Type strain
- CCUG 45454, CIP 106861, DSM 15913, JCM 13508, KMM 426, LMG 19693, VKM B-2137D, EI10

Species of bacterium

Arenibacter latericius is a Gram-negative, aerobic, rod-shaped and non-motile bacterium from the genus Arenibacter which has been isolated from sandy sediments from the South China Sea.
