= Adetaptera insularis =

Scientific classification
- Domain: Eukaryota
- Kingdom: Animalia
- Phylum: Arthropoda
- Class: Insecta
- Order: Coleoptera
- Suborder: Polyphaga
- Infraorder: Cucujiformia
- Family: Cerambycidae
- Genus: Adetaptera
- Species: A. insularis

Binomial name
- Adetaptera insularis (Fisher, 1930)

Synonyms
- Parmenonta insularis Fisher, 1930

Species of beetle

Adetaptera insularis is a species of beetle in the family Cerambycidae. It was described by Fisher in 1930.
