= Aponia insularis =

Scientific classification
- Kingdom: Animalia
- Phylum: Arthropoda
- Class: Insecta
- Order: Lepidoptera
- Family: Crambidae
- Genus: Aponia
- Species: A. insularis

Binomial name
- Aponia insularis Munroe, 1964

Species of moth

Aponia insularis is a moth in the family Crambidae. It was described by Eugene G. Munroe in 1964. It is found in Cuba.
