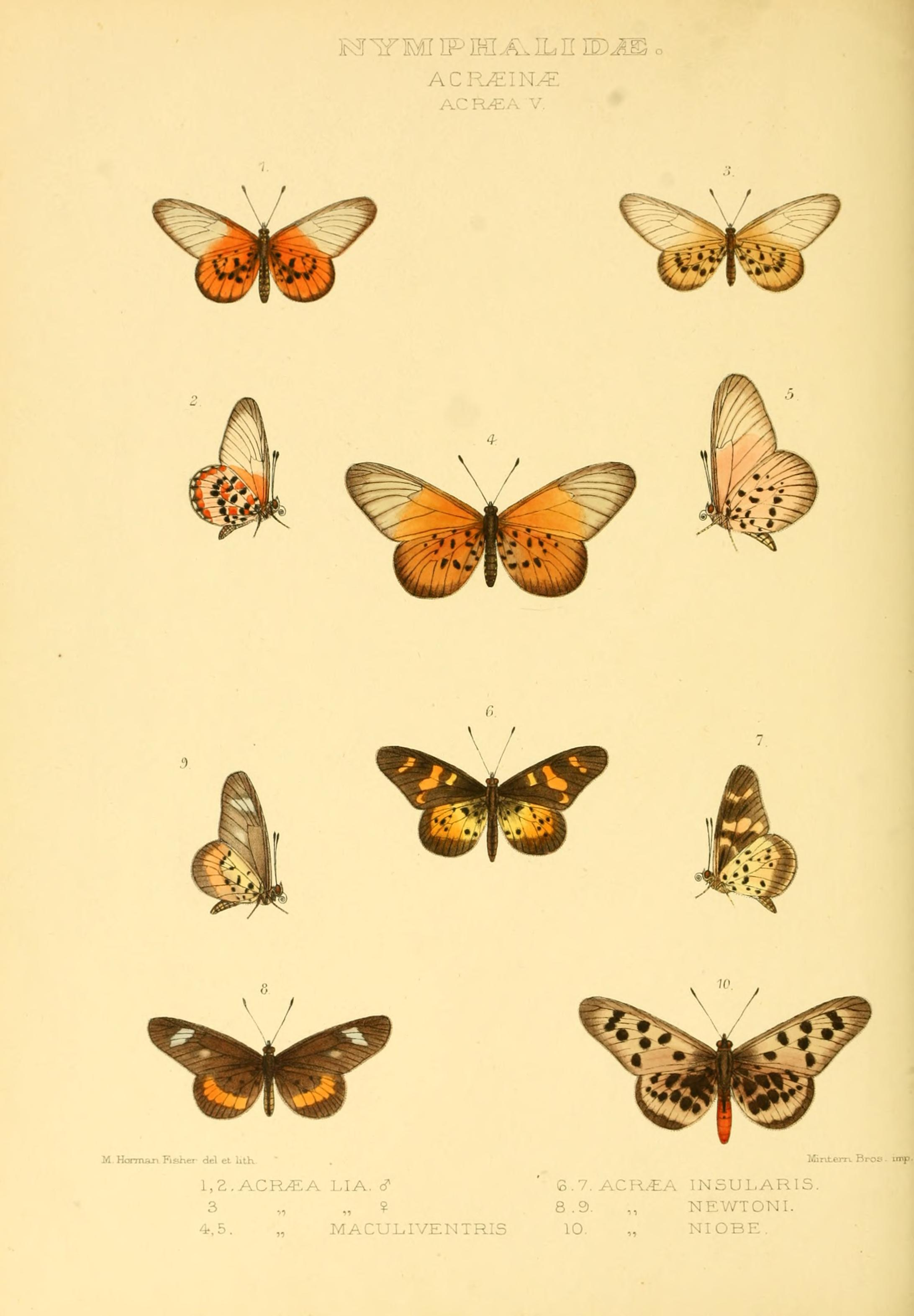
- Figures 6 and 7

Scientific classification
- Kingdom: Animalia
- Phylum: Arthropoda
- Class: Insecta
- Order: Lepidoptera
- Family: Nymphalidae
- Genus: Acraea
- Species: A. insularis

Binomial name
- Acraea insularis Sharpe, 1893

Synonyms
- Acraea (Actinote) insularis

= Acraea insularis =

Species of butterfly

Acraea insularis is a butterfly in the family Nymphalidae. It is found on the island of São Tomé. The species was first named in 1893 by Emily Mary Bowdler Sharpe.

== Description ==
A. insularis E. Sharpe. Forewing above black-brown with a yellow transverse spot in the middle of the cell and a similar orange-yellow spot at its apex, an orange-yellow spot in the basal part of 2, a free, crescentic, small spot in 1 b near the distal margin and three small orange-yellow subapical spots in 4-6, of which the one in 4 is placed nearer to the distal margin and quite free. The hind wing above at the base blackish as far as vein 2, then with a broad median band about 5 mm. in breadth, at the inner margin and towards the base light yellow, distally orange-yellow, projecting almost rectangularly distad in cellule 4 (almost as in johnstoni) and adorned with black discal dots; the hindwing beneath light yellowish to the base with free black dots and beyond the middle with a broad blackish transverse band, which is separated from the distal margin by a fine light line; this light marginal line is broken up into small spots by the dark veins and the streaks on the internearal folds. Island of Sao Thome.

== Taxonomy ==
It is a member of the Acraea jodutta species group - but see also Pierre & Bernaud, 2014
