= Acalolepta insularis =

Scientific classification
- Kingdom: Animalia
- Phylum: Arthropoda
- Class: Insecta
- Order: Coleoptera
- Suborder: Polyphaga
- Infraorder: Cucujiformia
- Family: Cerambycidae
- Genus: Acalolepta
- Species: A. insularis

Binomial name
- Acalolepta insularis (Breuning, 1939)

Synonyms
- Dihammus insularis Breuning, 1939

Species of beetle

Acalolepta insularis is a species of beetle in the family Cerambycidae. It was described by Stephan von Breuning in 1939. It is known from Indonesia.
