= Morrisia squamosa =

Scientific classification
- Domain: Eukaryota
- Kingdom: Animalia
- Phylum: Arthropoda
- Class: Insecta
- Order: Coleoptera
- Suborder: Polyphaga
- Infraorder: Cucujiformia
- Family: Cerambycidae
- Genus: Morrisia
- Species: M. squamosa

Binomial name
- Morrisia squamosa (Chemsak & Noguera, 1993)

Synonyms
- Adetus squamosus Chemsak & Noguera, 1993

Species of beetle

Morrisia squamosa is a species of beetle in the family Cerambycidae. It was described by Chemsak and Noguera in 1993.
