= Amata insularis =

Scientific classification
- Domain: Eukaryota
- Kingdom: Animalia
- Phylum: Arthropoda
- Class: Insecta
- Order: Lepidoptera
- Superfamily: Noctuoidea
- Family: Erebidae
- Subfamily: Arctiinae
- Genus: Amata
- Species: A. insularis

Binomial name
- Amata insularis (Butler, 1876)

Synonyms
- Hydrusa insularis Butler, 1876; Hydrusa stelotis Meyrick, 1886; Syntomis microspila Turner, 1922

Species of moth

Amata insularis is a species of moth of the family Erebidae first described by Arthur Gardiner Butler in 1876. It is found in Queensland, Australia.
