= Avena insularis =

Scientific classification
- Kingdom: Plantae
- Clade: Tracheophytes
- Clade: Angiosperms
- Clade: Monocots
- Clade: Commelinids
- Order: Poales
- Family: Poaceae
- Subfamily: Pooideae
- Genus: Avena
- Species: A. insularis

Binomial name
- Avena insularis Ladiz.

Species of grass

Avena insularis is a species of wild oat in the genus Avena that is native to Southern Sicilia and North-Eastern Tunisia. The species is a tetraploid and is found in uncultivated patches around the Mediterranean.

The species is suspected of being closely related to hexaploid oats Avena sativa and Avena byzantina.
