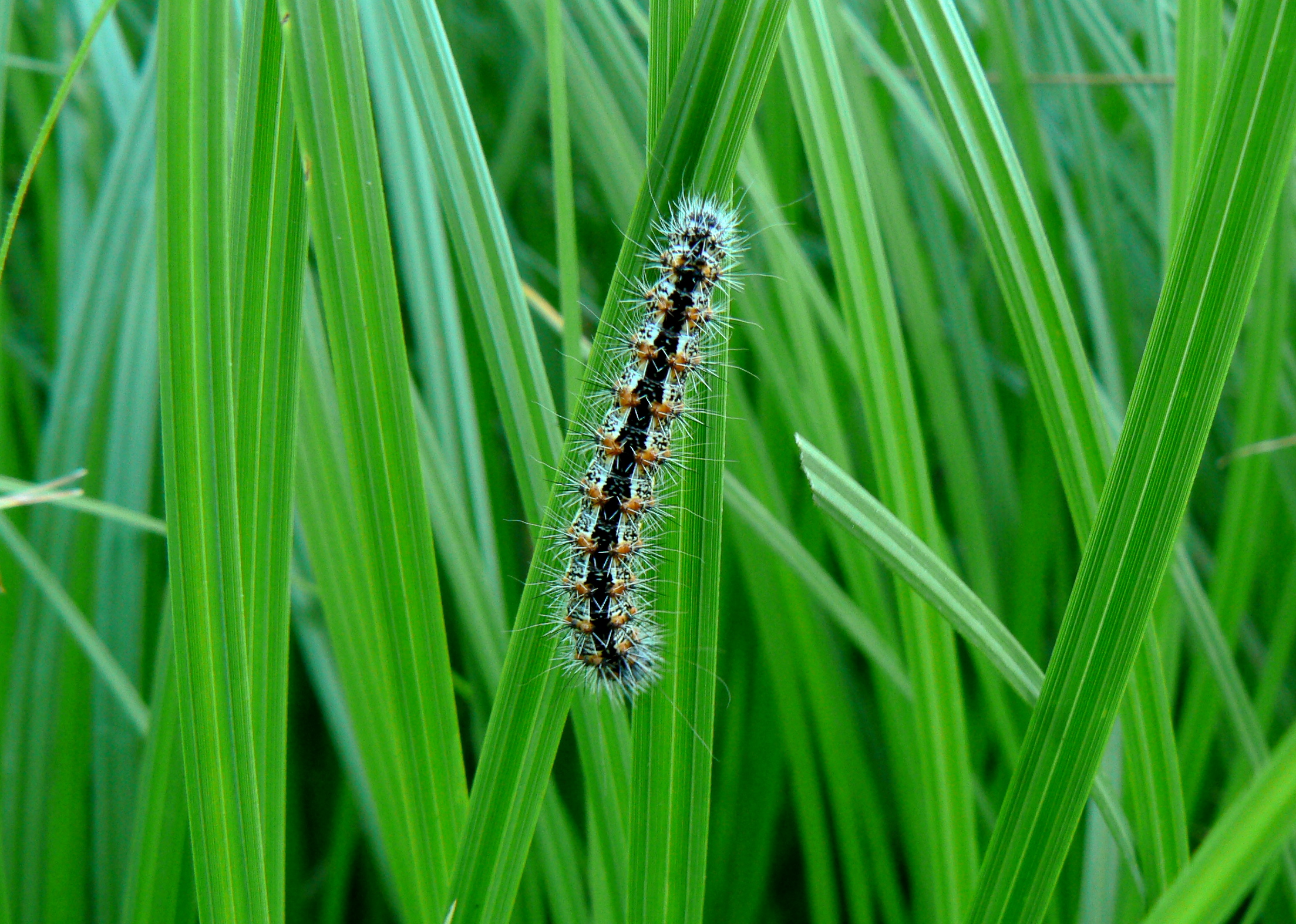

Scientific classification
- Kingdom: Animalia
- Phylum: Arthropoda
- Clade: Pancrustacea
- Class: Insecta
- Order: Lepidoptera
- Superfamily: Noctuoidea
- Family: Noctuidae
- Genus: Acronicta
- Species: A. insularis

Binomial name
- Acronicta insularis (Herrich-Schäffer, 1868)

Synonyms
- Simyra insularis Herrich-Schäffer, 1868; Leucania henrici Grote, 1873; Simyra henrici (Grote, 1873); Leucania evanida Grote, 1873; Simyra evanida (Grote, 1873); Ablepharon fumosum Morrison, 1874; Simyra fumosa (Morrison, 1874); Ommatostolidea julithae Benjamin, 1933

= Acronicta insularis =

Species of moth

Acronicta insularis, the cattail caterpillar (when referring to the larva) or Henry's marsh moth (when referring to the adult), is a moth of the family Noctuidae. The species was first described by Gottlieb August Wilhelm Herrich-Schäffer in 1868. It is found from coast to coast throughout the United States and southern Canada (Ontario, Quebec, New Brunswick, Nova Scotia, British Columbia, Alberta, Saskatchewan and Manitoba).

The wingspan is 35–40 mm. Adults are on wing from April to September.

The larvae feed on Typha and Polygonum species, as well as various grasses and sedges, poplar and willow.

Acronicta insularis was formerly called Simyra insularis. In 2015, the genus Simyra, along with Oxicesta and Eogena, were moved to Acronicta based on phylogenetic analysis.

The MONA or Hodges number for Acronicta insularis is 9280.

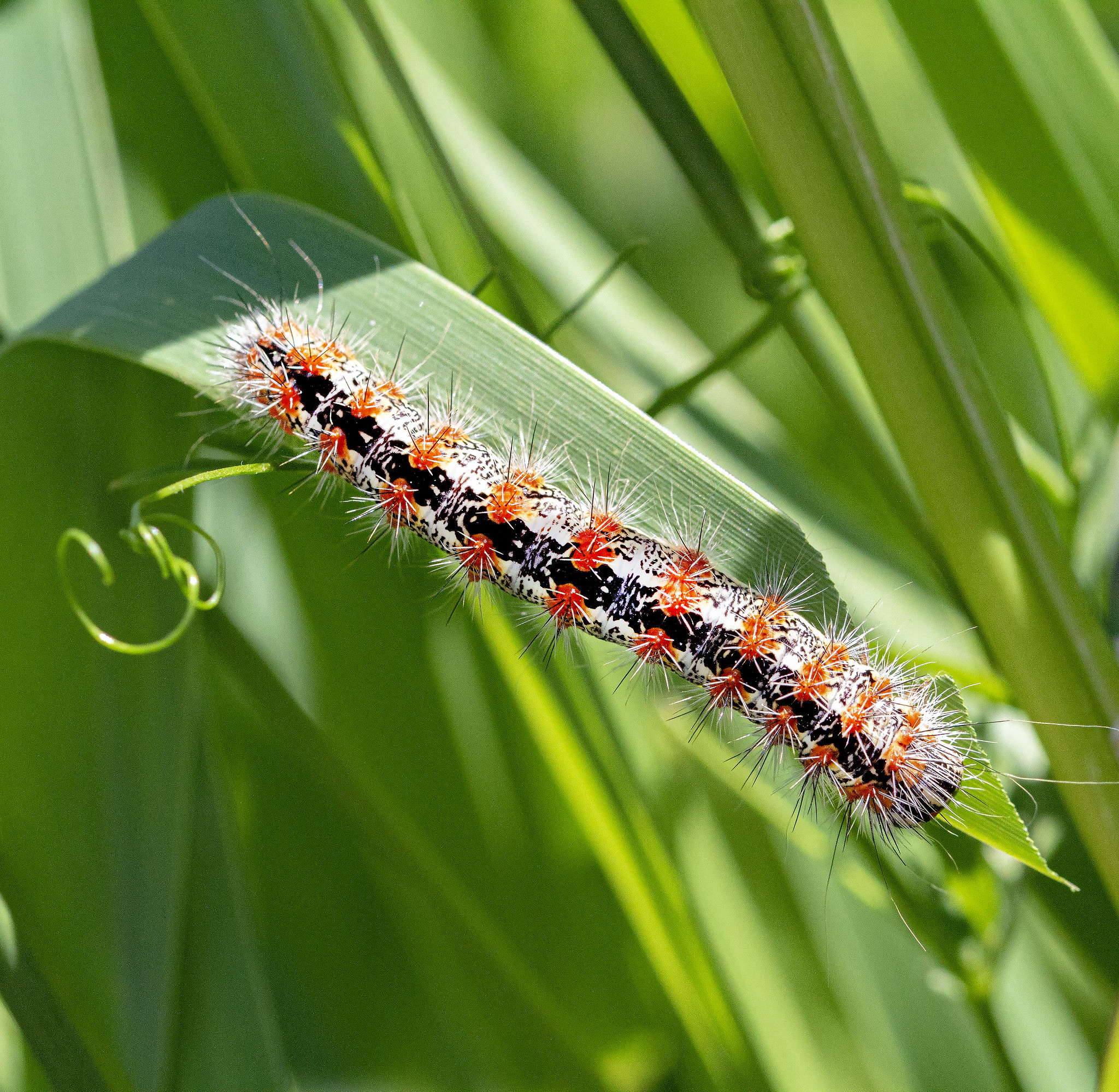
Marsh Dagger (Acronicta insularis)

== Subspecies ==
- Acronicta insularis insularis
- Acronicta insularis julitae
