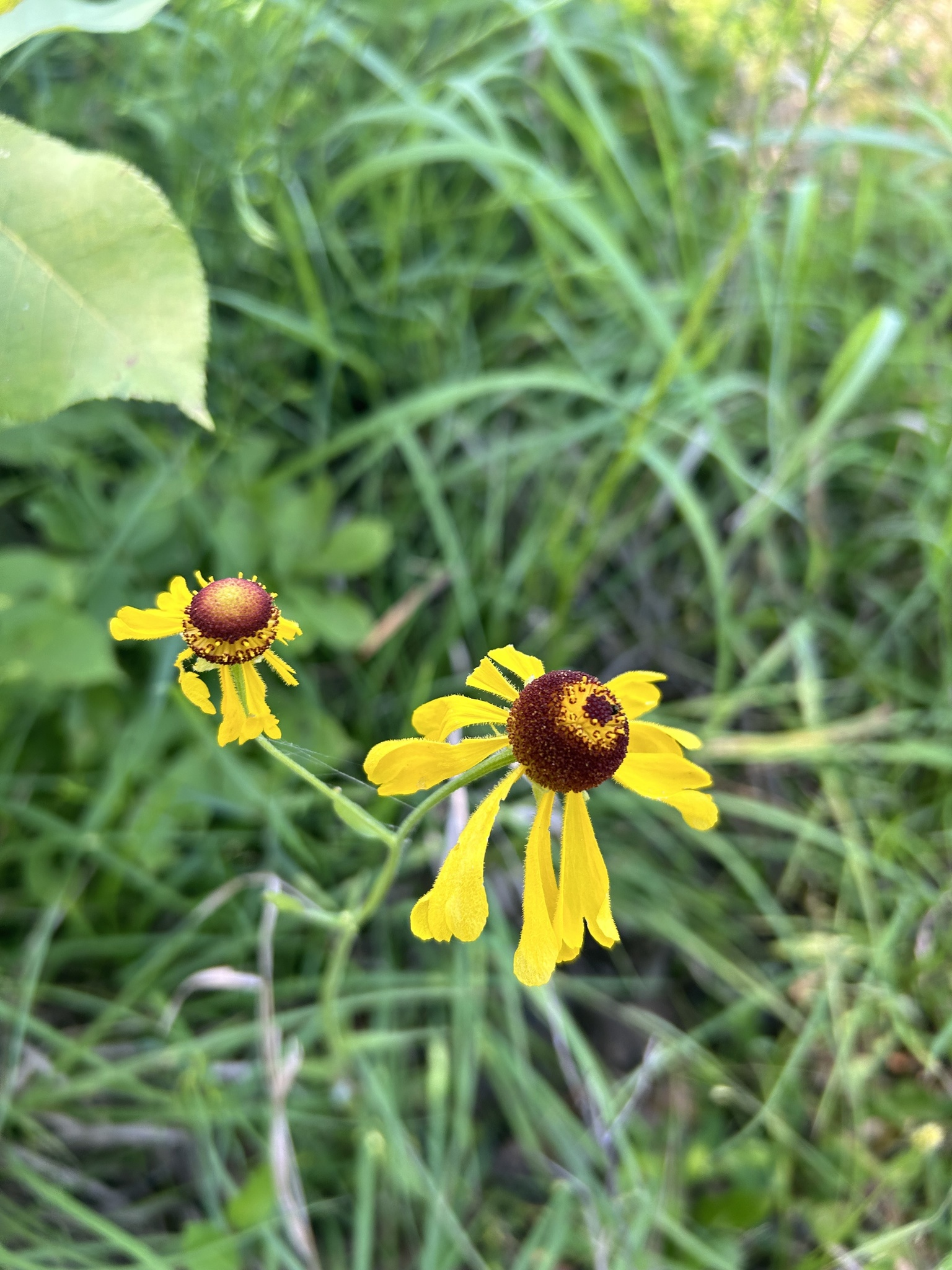

Scientific classification
- Kingdom: Plantae
- Clade: Tracheophytes
- Clade: Angiosperms
- Clade: Eudicots
- Clade: Asterids
- Order: Asterales
- Family: Asteraceae
- Genus: Helenium
- Species: H. campestre

Binomial name
- Helenium campestre Small 1903

= Helenium campestre =

Species of flowering plant

Helenium campestre is a North American perennial plant in the sunflower family, commonly known as oldfield sneezeweed or arkansas sneezeweed. It is native to the southeastern United States, in Arkansas and northwestern Louisiana.

== Description ==
Helenium campestre is a perennial herb up to 100 cm (40 inches) tall. One plant can produce as many as 20 flower heads, in branching arrays. The head is spherical or egg-shaped, with sometimes as many as 700 disc florets, each floret yellow near the base but purple or brown towards the tip. There are also 9-15 yellow ray florets. The species grows in ditches, fields, and streambanks.

=== Similar species ===
The plant is often misidentified as Southern Sneezeweed (Helenium flexuosum) but it can be identified by the number of lobes on the disk florets. H. Campestre has 5 lobes, while H. flexuosom has 4. The flowers on H. campestre are larger and droop more.

== Distribution ==
This species has a very limited distribution, occurring only in Arkansas and Louisiana. Within Louisiana, it has been documented in Bossier Parish and Webster Parish.
