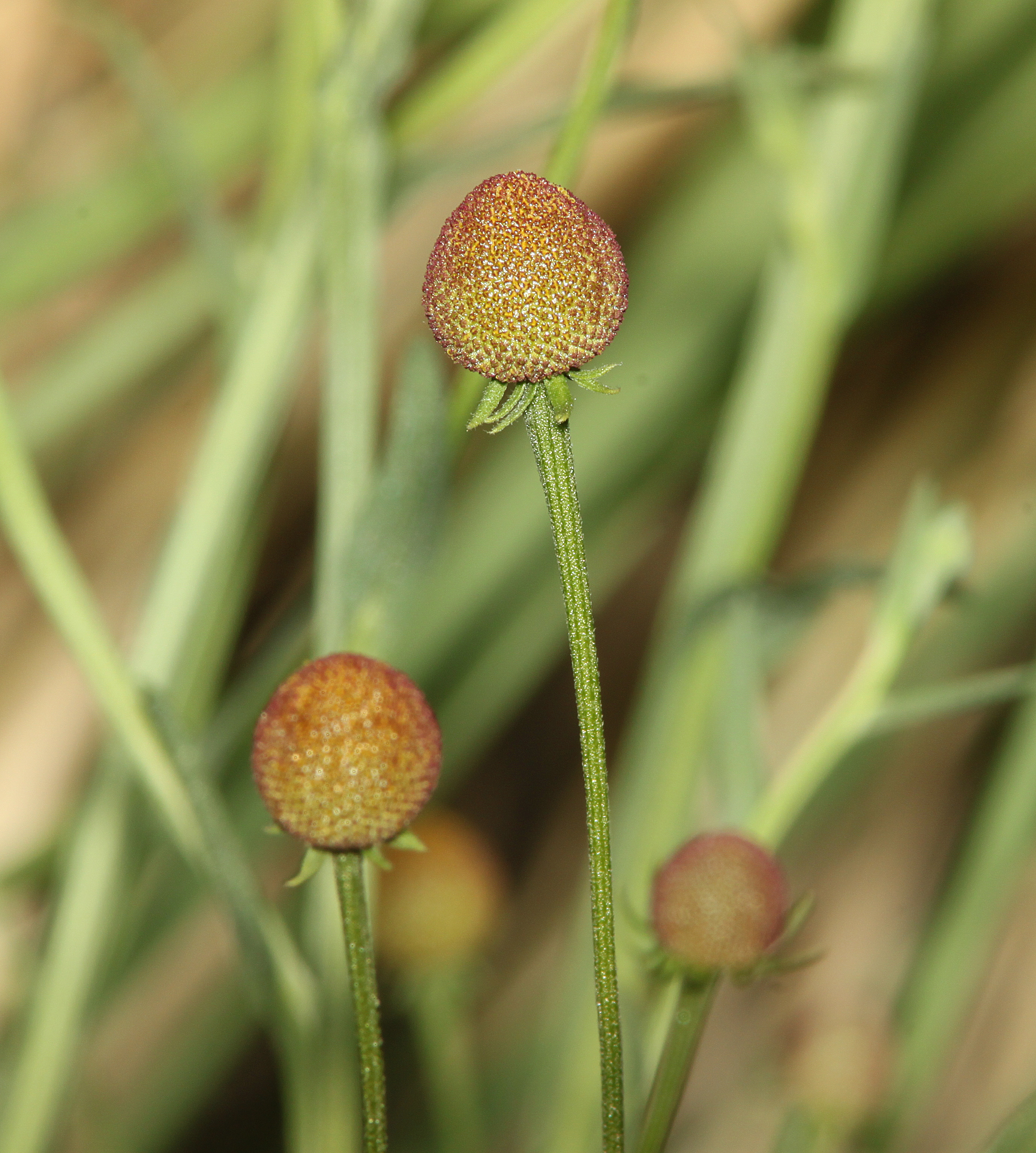

Conservation status
- Apparently Secure (NatureServe)

Scientific classification
- Kingdom: Plantae
- Clade: Tracheophytes
- Clade: Angiosperms
- Clade: Eudicots
- Clade: Asterids
- Order: Asterales
- Family: Asteraceae
- Genus: Helenium
- Species: H. thurberi

Binomial name
- Helenium thurberi A.Gray 1883

= Helenium thurberi =

Species of flowering plant

Helenium thurberi is a North American plant in the sunflower family, commonly known as Thurber's sneezeweed. It is native to Mexico (Baja California Sur, Sinaloa, Nayarit, Chihuahua) and the southwestern United States (Arizona).

Helenium thurberi is an annual herb up to 100 cm (39.5 in) tall, with small wings running down the sides of the stems. Leaves are lance-shaped. One plant can produce up to 120 flower heads, in a branching array. Each head has an egg-shaped or conical disc that may contain 500 or more minuscule disc flowers each 1.0–1.3 mm (0.039–0.051 in) across, each yellow toward the bottom but brown or reddish-brown toward the tip. There are no ray flowers.
