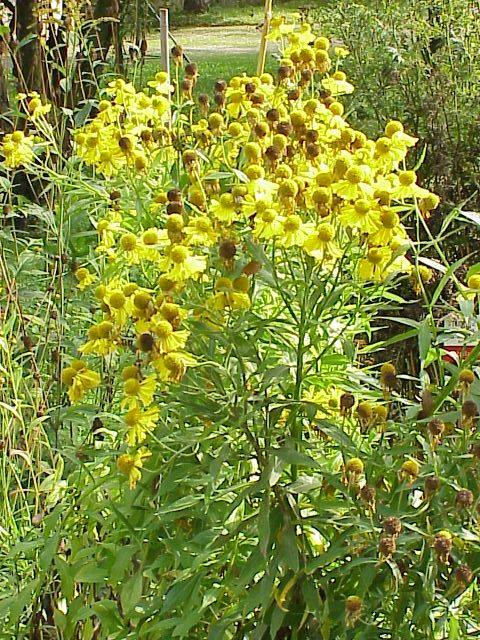

Conservation status
- Secure (NatureServe)

Scientific classification
- Kingdom: Plantae
- Clade: Tracheophytes
- Clade: Angiosperms
- Clade: Eudicots
- Clade: Asterids
- Order: Asterales
- Family: Asteraceae
- Genus: Helenium
- Species: H. autumnale

Binomial name
- Helenium autumnale L. 1753

Synonyms
- Heleniastrum autumnale (L.) Kuntze; Helenium canaliculatum Lam.; Helenium latifolium Mill.; Helenium macranthum Rydb.; Helenium montanum Nutt.; Helenium parviflorum Nutt.

= Helenium autumnale =

Species of flowering plant

Helenium autumnale is a North American species of flowering plants in the family Asteraceae. Common names include common sneezeweed and large-flowered sneezeweed.

== Description ==
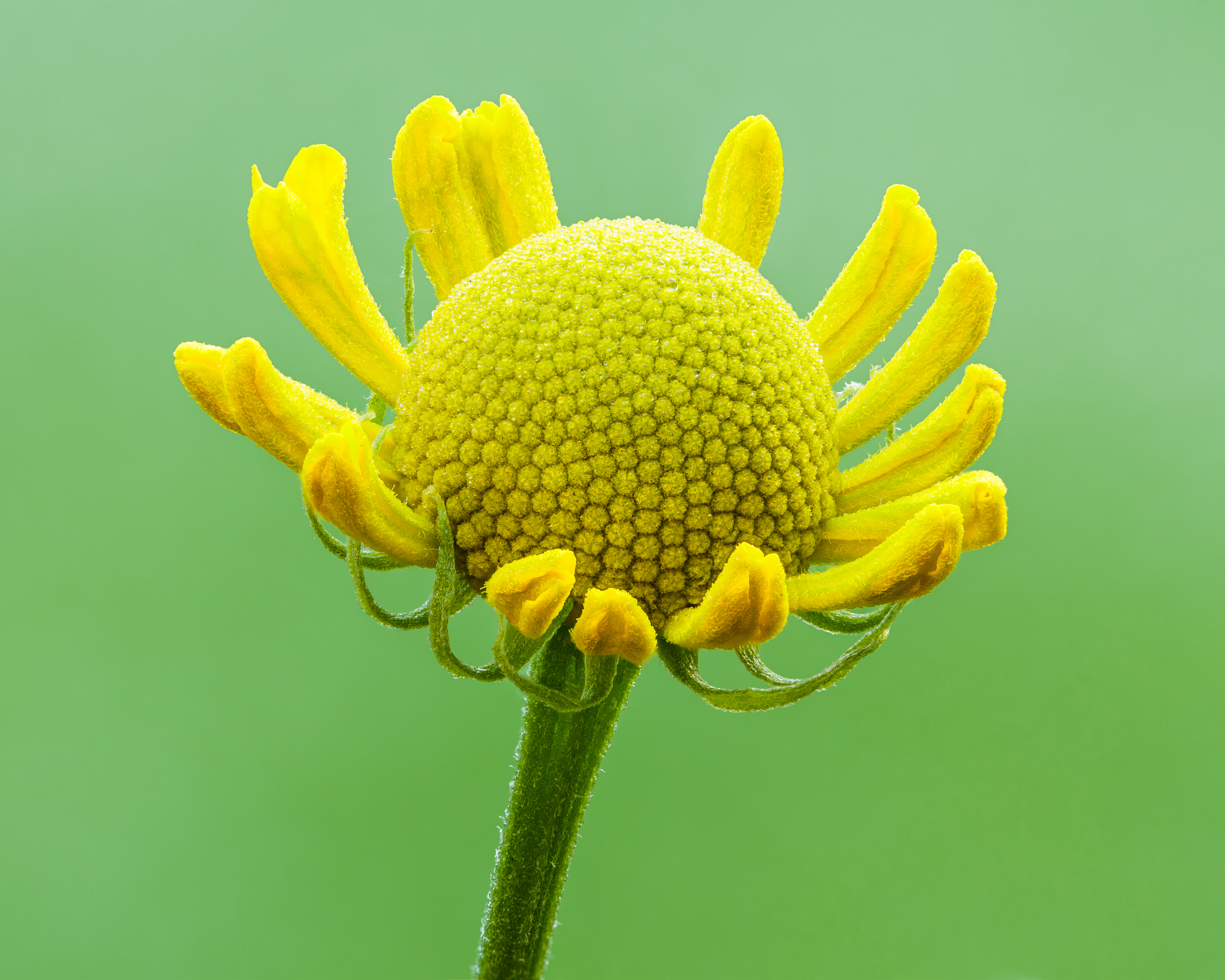
Close-up of flower

Common sneezeweed is a perennial herb up to 130 cm (51 1/3 in; 4 1/3 ft) tall. In late summer and fall, one plant can produce as many as 100 yellow flower heads in a branching array. Each head has yellow 11–21 ray florets surrounding sometimes as many as 800 yellow disc florets. Leaves are dark green, alternate, and lance-shaped. The Latin specific epithet autumnale is in reference to the plant's autumn flowering.

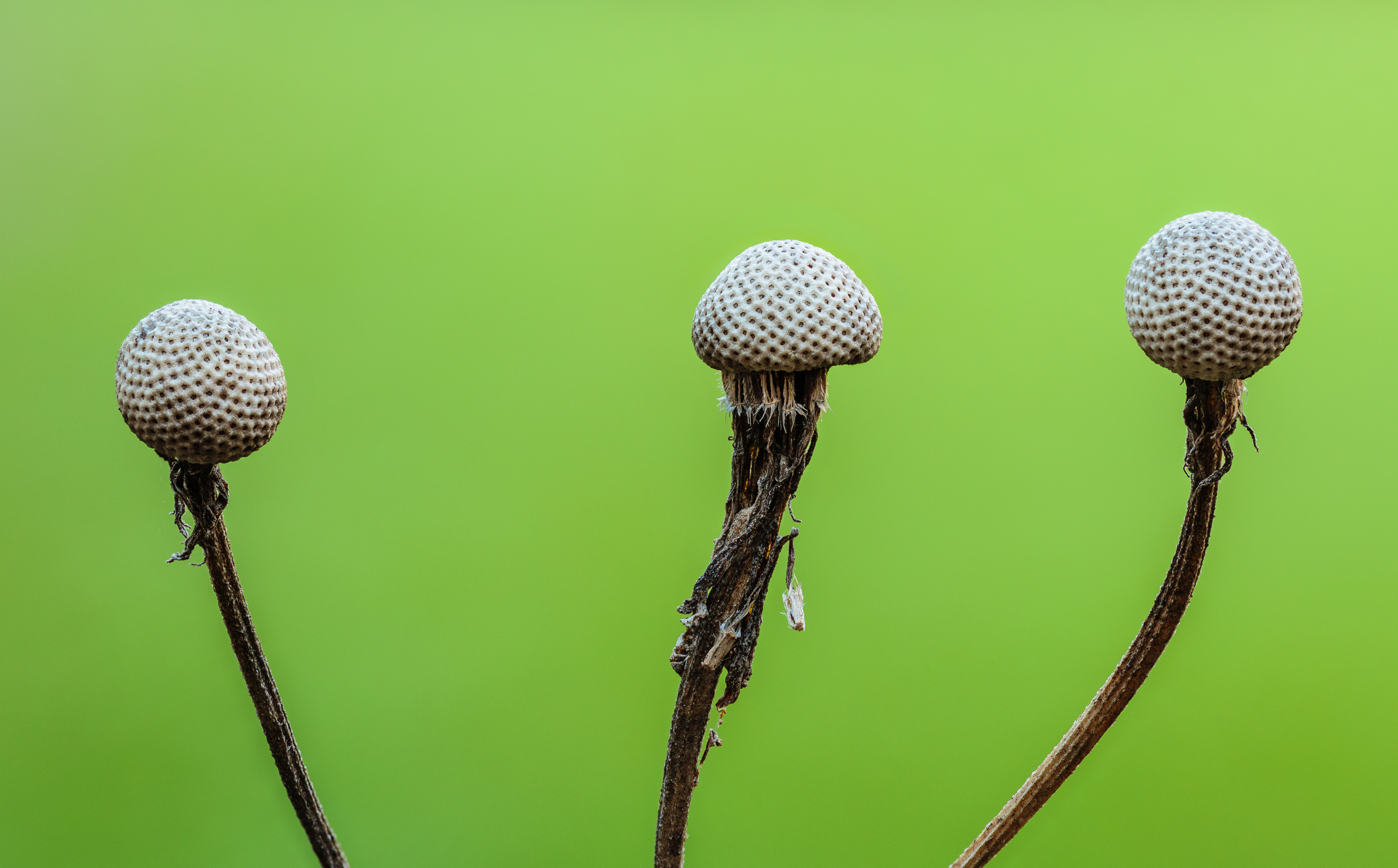
Almost empty seed pods of a Helenium autumnale in March.

== Distribution and habitat ==
This plant is widespread across much of the United States and Canada, from Northwest Territories as far south as far northern California, Arizona, Louisiana, and Florida. It has not been found in southern or central California, nor in the four Atlantic Provinces of Canada. It grows in moist, open areas along streams and ponds as well as wet meadows.

== Ecology ==
The flowers attract various pollinators, including bees, butterflies, and wasps. Because the plant is pollinated by insects, not wind pollinated, it does not cause seasonal allergies or sneezing, despite its common name. The plant is poisonous to ruminants.

== Cultivation ==
Common sneezeweed is cultivated as a garden perennial. There are multiple named varieties varying in color and height. 'Pumilum Magnificum' is a yellow variety about two feet tall. 'Bruno', a reddish-brown cultivar, 'Kupfersprudel', which is yellow/orange, and 'Butterpat', which is golden, all grow 3 to 3.5 feet (91 to 107 centimetres) tall. 'Chippersfield Orange' is up to 0.91 metres (3 ft) tall and is orange streaked with gold.

== Uses ==
=== Health ===
Only in small amounts, the plant has some health benefits. The dried nearly mature flower heads are used in a powdered form as a snuff to treat colds and headaches. When made into a tea they are used in the treatment of intestinal worms. The powdered leaves are sternutatory. An infusion of the leaves is laxative and alterative. An infusion of the stems has been used as a wash in the treatment of fevers. The plant contains helenalin, a compound that has shown significant anti-tumour activity.

=== Folk remedies ===
The plant owes its name to the use of its dried leaves in snuff, the inhaling of which causes sneezing—supposedly casting out evil spirits.
