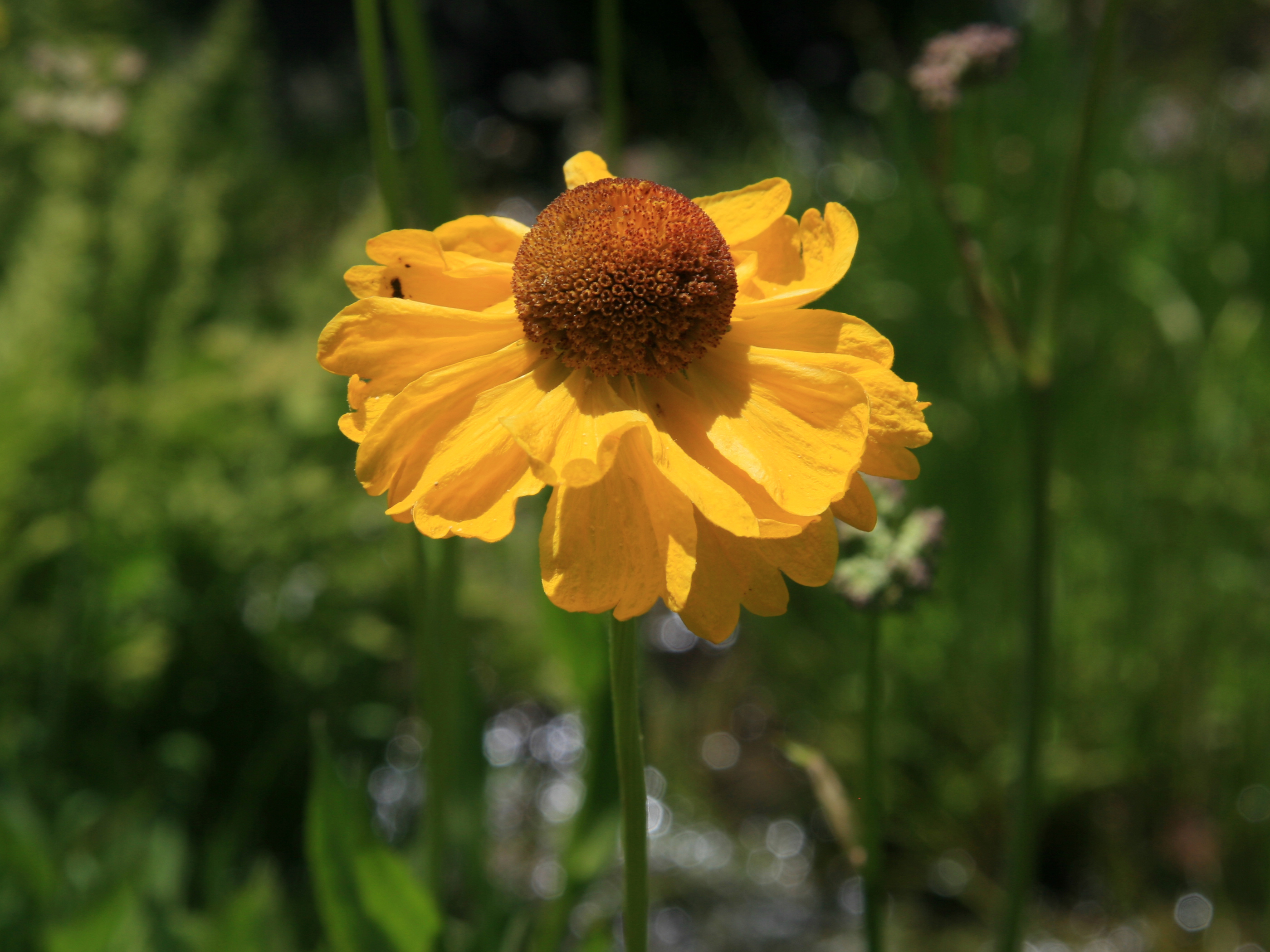

Conservation status
- Secure (NatureServe)

Scientific classification
- Kingdom: Plantae
- Clade: Tracheophytes
- Clade: Angiosperms
- Clade: Eudicots
- Clade: Asterids
- Order: Asterales
- Family: Asteraceae
- Genus: Helenium
- Species: H. bigelovii

Binomial name
- Helenium bigelovii A. Gray 1857

Synonyms
- Heleniastrum rivulare Greene; Helenium rivulare (Greene) Rydb.

= Helenium bigelovii =

Species of flowering plant

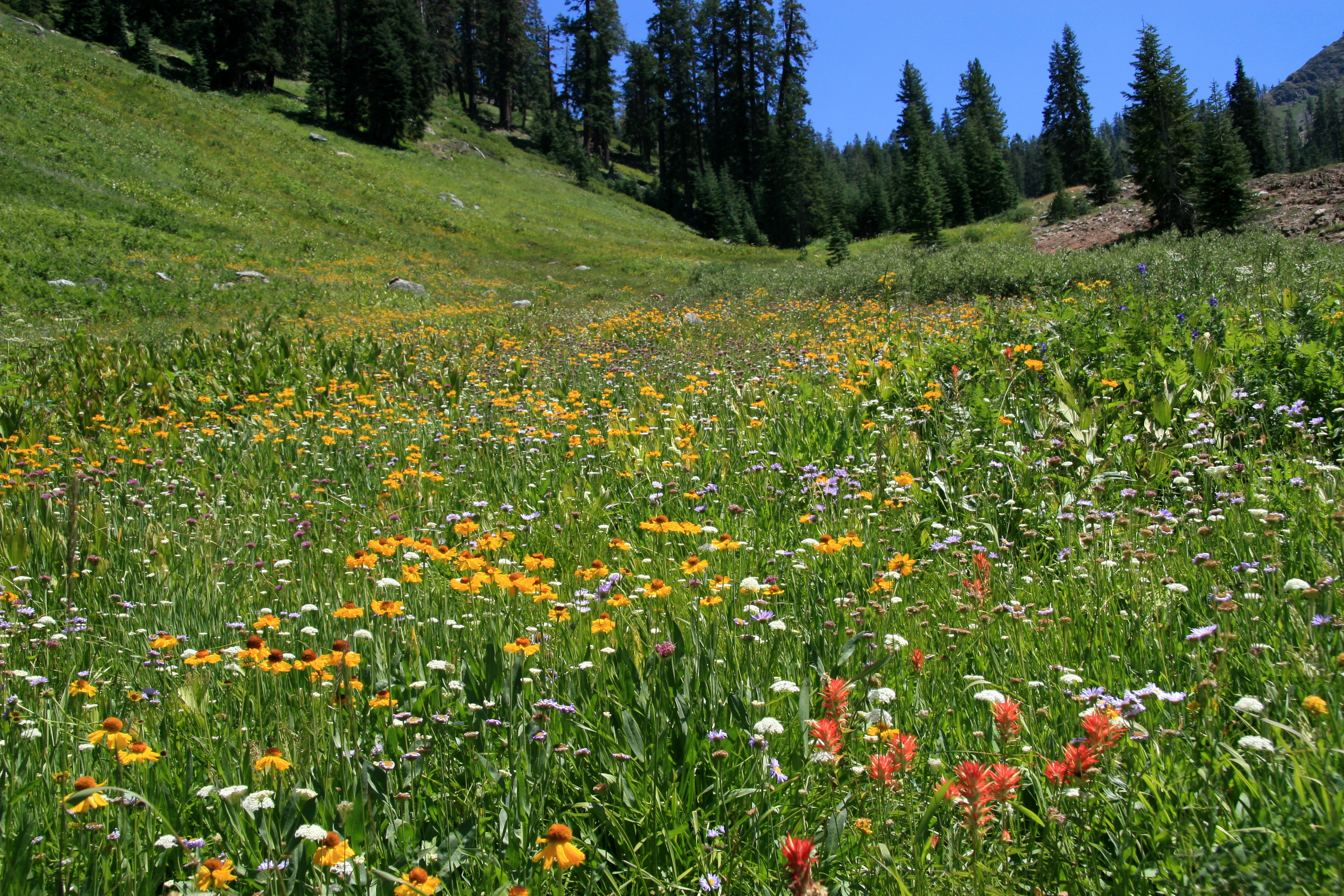
Bigelow sneezeweed as dominant flower in a mountain meadow

Helenium bigelovii is a North American perennial plant in the sunflower family, commonly known as Bigelow's sneezeweed. It grows in moist areas such as meadows, marshes, or streamsides. It is found at moderate and higher elevations (3000–10,000 ft) in the foothills and mountains of California and Oregon: Cascades, Coast Ranges, Klamath Mountains, Sierra Nevada, etc. Cultivars of the species are used in gardening as ornamentals.

Helenium bigelovii is a perennial herb sometimes as much as 130 cm (51 in; 4.5 ft) tall. One plant can produce as many as 20 flower heads, either one per branch or in branching arrays. Each head has 14-20 yellow ray florets (bending backwards and with teeth at the tips) surrounding sometimes as many as 800 disc florets (yellow at first, turning brown as they get older).

The species is named for J.M. Bigelow, a plant collector on the United States and Mexican Boundary Survey in the 1850s.
