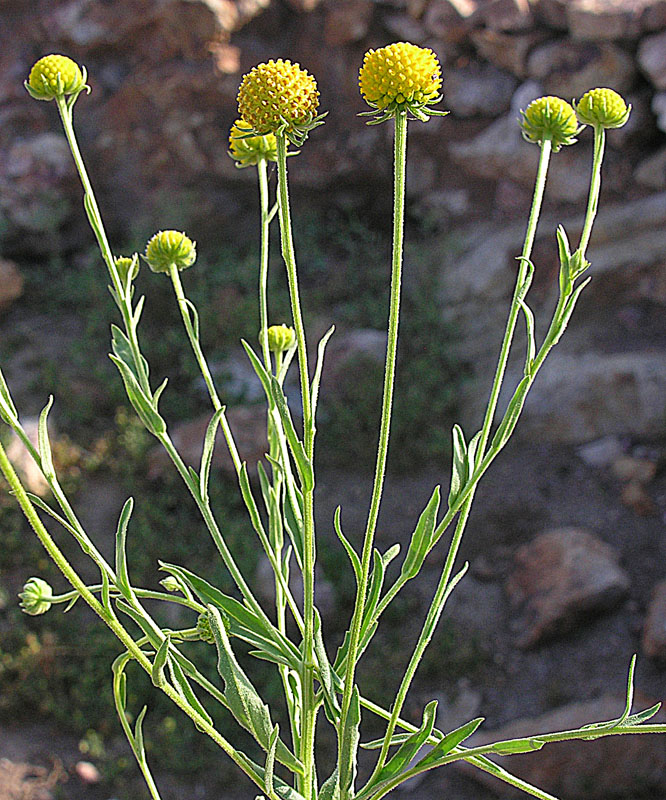

Scientific classification
- Kingdom: Plantae
- Clade: Tracheophytes
- Clade: Angiosperms
- Clade: Eudicots
- Clade: Asterids
- Order: Asterales
- Family: Asteraceae
- Genus: Helenium
- Species: H. aromaticum

Binomial name
- Helenium aromaticum (Hook.) L.H.Bailey

= Helenium aromaticum =

Species of plant

Helenium aromaticum is a species of sneezeweed found in the countries of Chile and Peru. It grows as a self-supporting herb, forming broad leaves.
