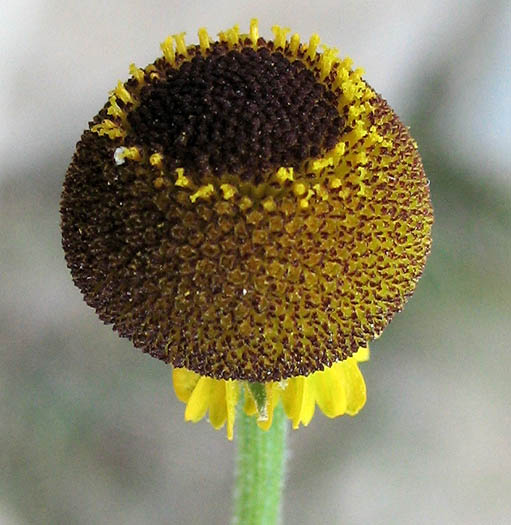

Scientific classification
- Kingdom: Plantae
- Clade: Tracheophytes
- Clade: Angiosperms
- Clade: Eudicots
- Clade: Asterids
- Order: Asterales
- Family: Asteraceae
- Genus: Helenium
- Species: H. puberulum

Binomial name
- Helenium puberulum DC. 1836

Synonyms
- Cephalophora decurrens Less.; Helenium decurrens (Less.) Vatke

= Helenium puberulum =

Species of flowering plant

Helenium puberulum is a North American species of flowering plants in the daisy family known by the common name rosilla. It is native to California and Baja California, where it can be found in moist habitats such as riverbanks and meadows. It has also been found in Oregon, although these might possibly be naturalized populations.

Helenium puberulum is an annual or perennial herb sometimes as much as 160 cm tall though other times much smaller. Most of the leaves are on the lower part of the plant. Stems are winged, meaning that they have flaps of tissue running down the sides. One plant can produce as many as 30 flower heads in a branched array. The head is unusual in that the part covered by the disc florets is almost completely spherical rather than conical as in most other species of the genus. There can sometimes be over 1000 small disc florets in the head, each yellow at the bottom but brown or purple toward the tip. The 13-17 yellow ray florets are small and inconspicuous, pointing backwards down the flower stalk. Sometimes the ray florets are completely absent. The fruit is a hairy achene one to two millimeters long.
