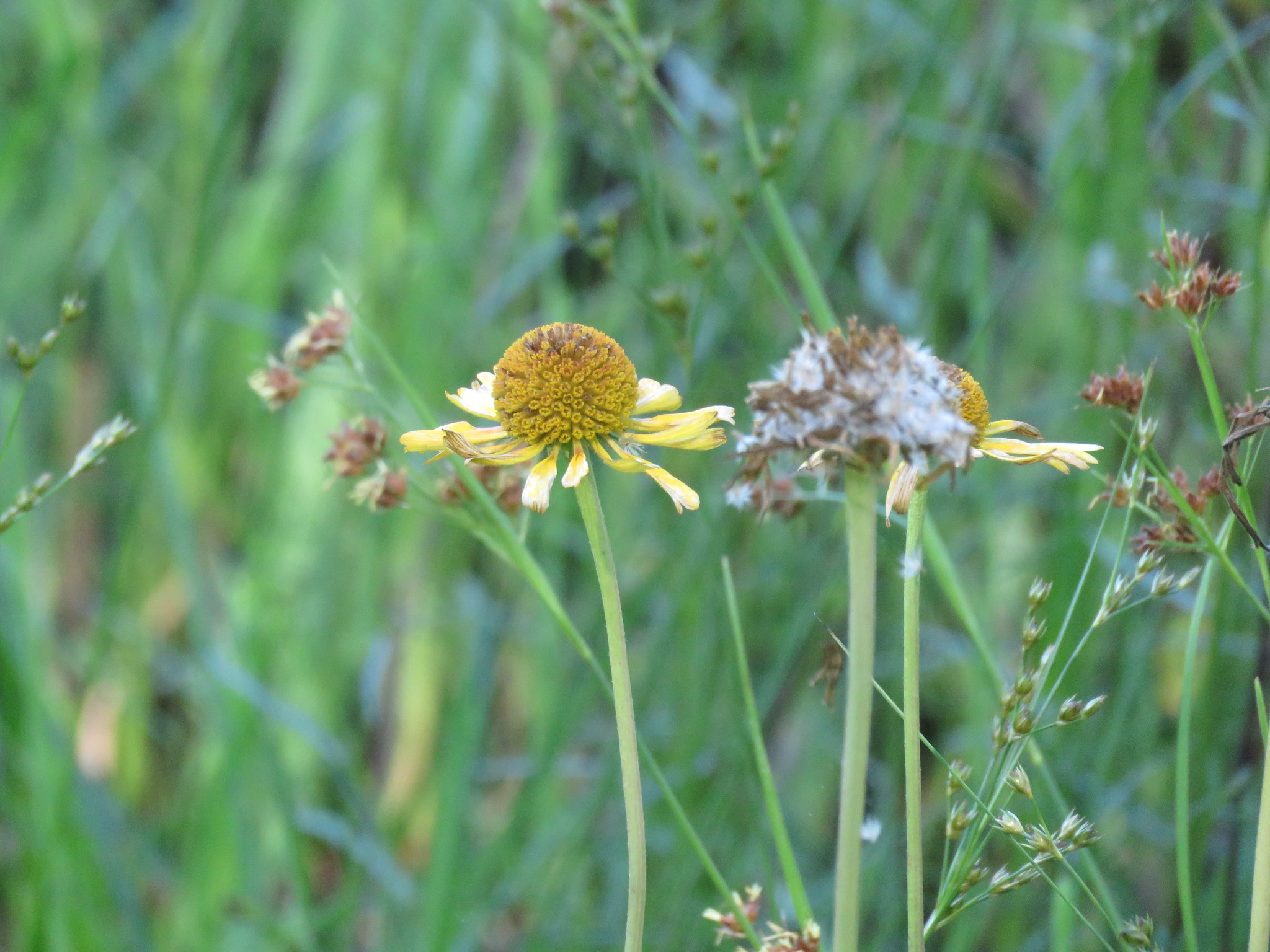

Scientific classification
- Kingdom: Plantae
- Clade: Tracheophytes
- Clade: Angiosperms
- Clade: Eudicots
- Clade: Asterids
- Order: Asterales
- Family: Asteraceae
- Genus: Helenium
- Species: H. drummondii

Binomial name
- Helenium drummondii H.Rock

Synonyms
- Leptopoda fimbriata Torr. & A.Gray 1842, illegitimate homonym not (Michx.) Eaton 1829

= Helenium drummondii =

Species of flowering plant

Helenium drummondii is a species of perennial plant in the Sunflower Family, commonly known as fringed sneezeweed. It is native to the south- central United States, in eastern Texas, Arkansas, and Louisiana.

Helenium drummondii is a perennial herb up to 60 cm (2 feet) tall. Leaves are long, thin, and grass-like. One plant can usually produce only 1-3 flower heads. The head is spherical or hemispherical, with sometimes as many as 1000 yellow disc florets, plus 13-30 yellow ray florets. The species grows in bogs, swamps, and other wet places.
