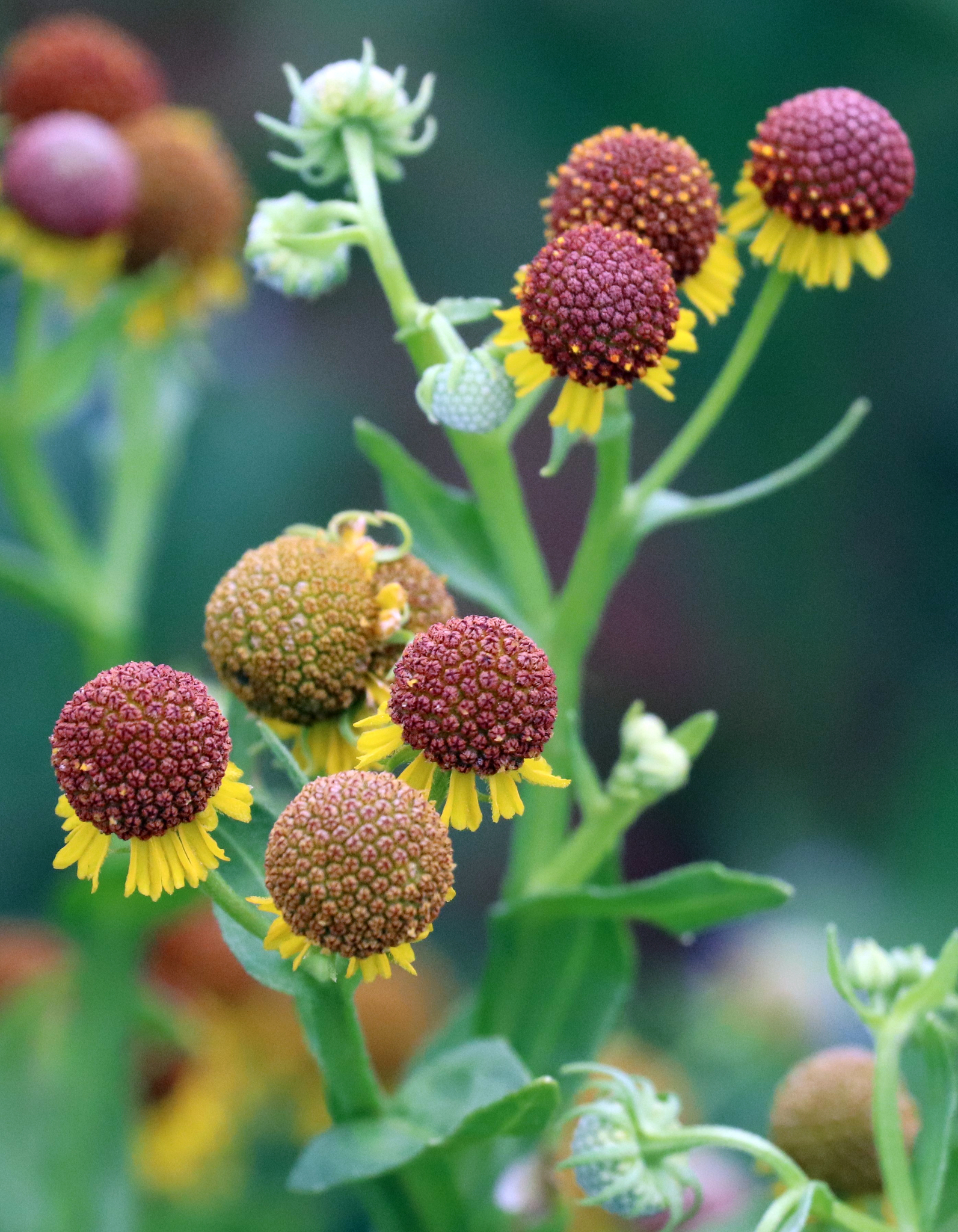

Conservation status
- Secure (NatureServe)

Scientific classification
- Kingdom: Plantae
- Clade: Tracheophytes
- Clade: Angiosperms
- Clade: Eudicots
- Clade: Asterids
- Order: Asterales
- Family: Asteraceae
- Genus: Helenium
- Species: H. microcephalum

Binomial name
- Helenium microcephalum DC. 1836

Synonyms
- Helenium oöclinium A.Gray, syn of var. ooclinium; Helenium ooclinium A.Gray, syn of var. ooclinium; Heleniastrum ooclinium (A.Gray) Kuntze, syn of var. ooclinium; Heleniastrum oöclinium(A.Gray) Kuntze, syn of var. ooclinium

= Helenium microcephalum =

Species of flowering plant

Helenium microcephalum is a North American perennial plant in the family Asteraceae, commonly known as smallhead sneezeweed. It is found in the southwestern and south-central United States and northern Mexico.

Helenium microcephalum is an annual herb up to 120 cm (3.9 ft) tall, with wings running down the sides of the stems. Leaves are narrow and elliptical. One plant can have 300 or more small spherical or egg-shaped flower heads, generally no more than 12 mm (half an inch) in diameter. Each head can have 400 or more minuscule disc flowers 1.2–2.4 mm (0.047–0.094 in) across, each yellow or yellow-green toward the bottom but brown or red toward the tip. There are also 7-13 red or yellow ray flowers.

Varieties

- Helenium microcephalum var. microcephalum - Arizona, New Mexico, Oklahoma, Colorado, Texas, Coahuila, Nuevo León, Tamaulipas
- Helenium microcephalum var. ooclinium (A. Gray) Bierner - Texas, Coahuila, Chihuahua, Nuevo León, Durango, San Luis Potosí
