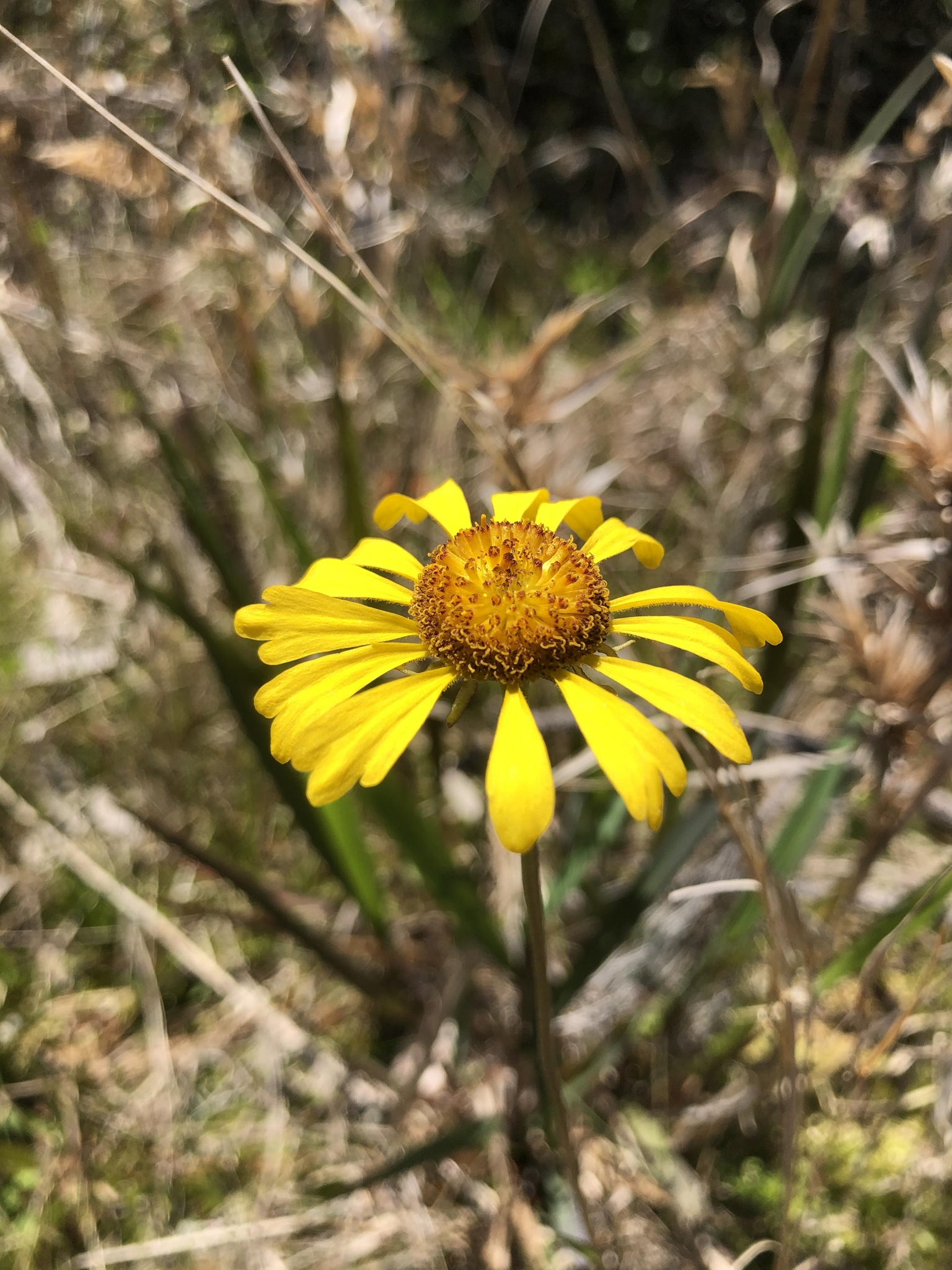

Scientific classification
- Kingdom: Plantae
- Clade: Tracheophytes
- Clade: Angiosperms
- Clade: Eudicots
- Clade: Asterids
- Order: Asterales
- Family: Asteraceae
- Genus: Helenium
- Species: H. brevifolium

Binomial name
- Helenium brevifolium Nutt. 1841

Synonyms
- Helenium curtisii A.Gray; Leptopoda brevifolia Nutt.

= Helenium brevifolium =

Species of flowering plant

Helenium brevifolium is a North American perennial plant in the sunflower family, commonly known as shortleaf sneezeweed. It is native to the southeastern United States, from Virginia to eastern Louisiana and inland as far as Tennessee.

Helenium brevifolium is a perennial herb up to 100 cm (40 inches) tall. One plant can produce as many as 10 flower heads, in branching arrays. The head is spherical or hemispherical, with sometimes as many as 800 disc florets, each floret yellow near the base but purple or brown or yellow towards the tip. There are also 9-24 yellow ray florets. The species grows in bogs, swamps, and other wet places.
