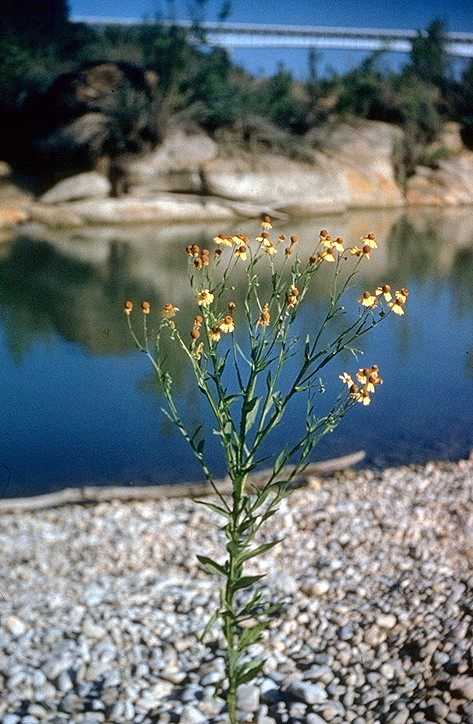

Scientific classification
- Kingdom: Plantae
- Clade: Tracheophytes
- Clade: Angiosperms
- Clade: Eudicots
- Clade: Asterids
- Order: Asterales
- Family: Asteraceae
- Genus: Helenium
- Species: H. elegans

Binomial name
- Helenium elegans DC. 1836

Synonyms
- Heleniastrum amphibolum (A.Gray) Kuntze, syn of var. amphibolum; Helenium amphibolum A.Gray, syn of var. amphibolum

= Helenium elegans =

Species of flowering plant

Helenium elegans is a North American perennial plant in the sunflower family, commonly known as pretty sneezeweed. It is native to the south-central United States and to northeastern Mexico.

Helenium elegans is an annual herb up to 120 cm (4 feet) tall. Stems have wings, meaning that they have flaps of tissue running down the sides. One plant can produce 200 or more small flower heads, in branching arrays. The head is very nearly spherical, nearly covered with as many as 700 disc florets, each floret yellow near the base but brown towards the tip. There are also 1-17 yellow or brown ray florets. The species grows along streambanks and in ditches.

Varieties

- Helenium elegans var. amphibolum (A.Gray) Bierner - Texas, Coahuila, Nuevo León, San Luis Potosí, Tamaulipas
- Helenium elegans var. elegans - Texas, Arkansas, Oklahoma, Louisiana
