= Helenium chihuahuense =

- Helenium chihuahuensis in bloom

Scientific classification
- Kingdom: Plantae
- Clade: Tracheophytes
- Clade: Angiosperms
- Clade: Eudicots
- Clade: Asterids
- Order: Asterales
- Family: Asteraceae
- Genus: Helenium
- Species: H. chihuahuense

Binomial name
- Helenium chihuahuense Bierner 1972

Synonyms
- Helenium chihuahuensis Bierner

Species of flowering plant

Helenium chihuahuense is a North American perennial plant in the sunflower family. It has been found only in the state of Chihuahua in northwestern Mexico.

Helenium chihuahuense is a branching annual herb up to 78 cm (31.2 inches) tall with thick rootstocks producing only one stem with a single flower head. The leaves are long, narrow and irregularly lobed. The head is spherical or egg-shaped, with many disc flowers, each yellow with purple tips. These are surrounded by about 14-15 yellow ray flowers.
