= Helenium vernale =

Scientific classification
- Kingdom: Plantae
- Clade: Tracheophytes
- Clade: Angiosperms
- Clade: Eudicots
- Clade: Asterids
- Order: Asterales
- Family: Asteraceae
- Genus: Helenium
- Species: H. vernale

Binomial name
- Helenium vernale Walter 1788

Synonyms
- Helenium helenium (Nutt.) Small; Helenium nuttallii A.Gray; Leptopoda helenium Nutt.

Species of flowering plant

Helenium vernale is a North American species of flowering plant in the aster family known by the common name Savanna sneezeweed or spring sneezeweed. It is native to the southeastern United States, from Louisiana to the Carolinas.

Helenium vernale is a perennial herb up to 80 cm (31.5 in) tall, with small wings running down the sides of the stem. One plant generally produces only 1–3 hemispherical flower heads, each on its own flower stalk. Each head can contain up to 800 minuscule disc flowers, each 4.6–6.0 mm (0.18–0.24 in) across, yellow at the base, yellow or yellow-brown near the tips. There are also 13–30 yellow ray flowers.
