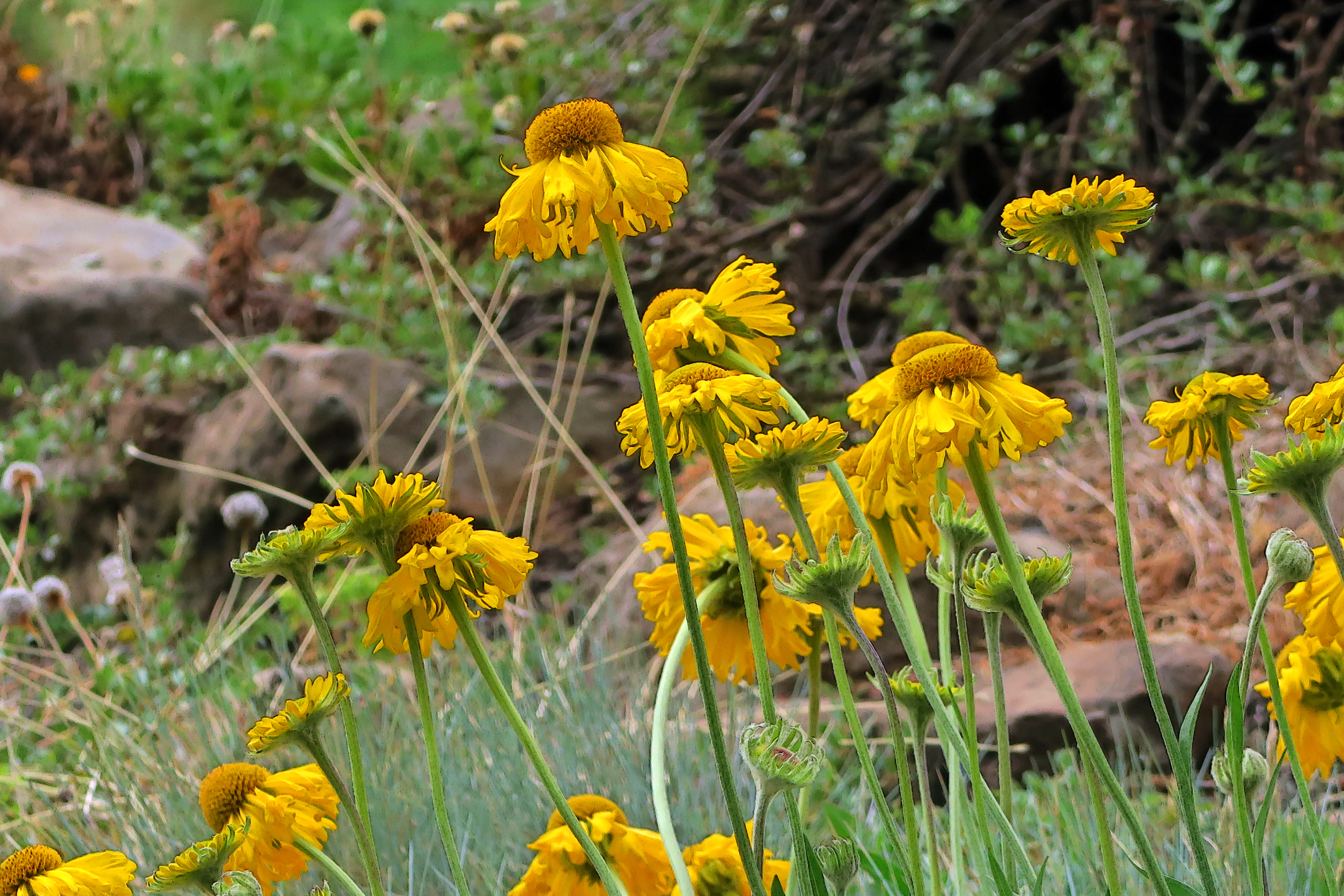

Scientific classification
- Kingdom: Plantae
- Clade: Tracheophytes
- Clade: Angiosperms
- Clade: Eudicots
- Clade: Asterids
- Order: Asterales
- Family: Asteraceae
- Genus: Helenium
- Species: H. bolanderi

Binomial name
- Helenium bolanderi Gray 1868

Synonyms
- Dugaldia grandiflora Rydb.; Helenium bigelovii var. festivum Jeps.

= Helenium bolanderi =

Species of flowering plant

Helenium bolanderi is a North American species of flowering plant in the family Asteraceae known by the common name coastal sneezeweed. It is native to southern Oregon and northern California as far south as Mendocino County, primarily along the seacoast.

Helenium bolanderi perennial herb sometimes as much as 140 cm (56 inches or 4 2/3 feet) in height. It has a generally unbranched, erect stem with oval-shaped leaves. The flowers arise on naked peduncles with one to three flower heads per plant. Each flower head has a fringe of 15-30 golden yellow ray florets bent backwards from a rounded center of sometimes over 1000 disc florets (yellow toward the base but brown or purple near the tips). The fruit is a tiny, hairy achene a few millimeters long.
