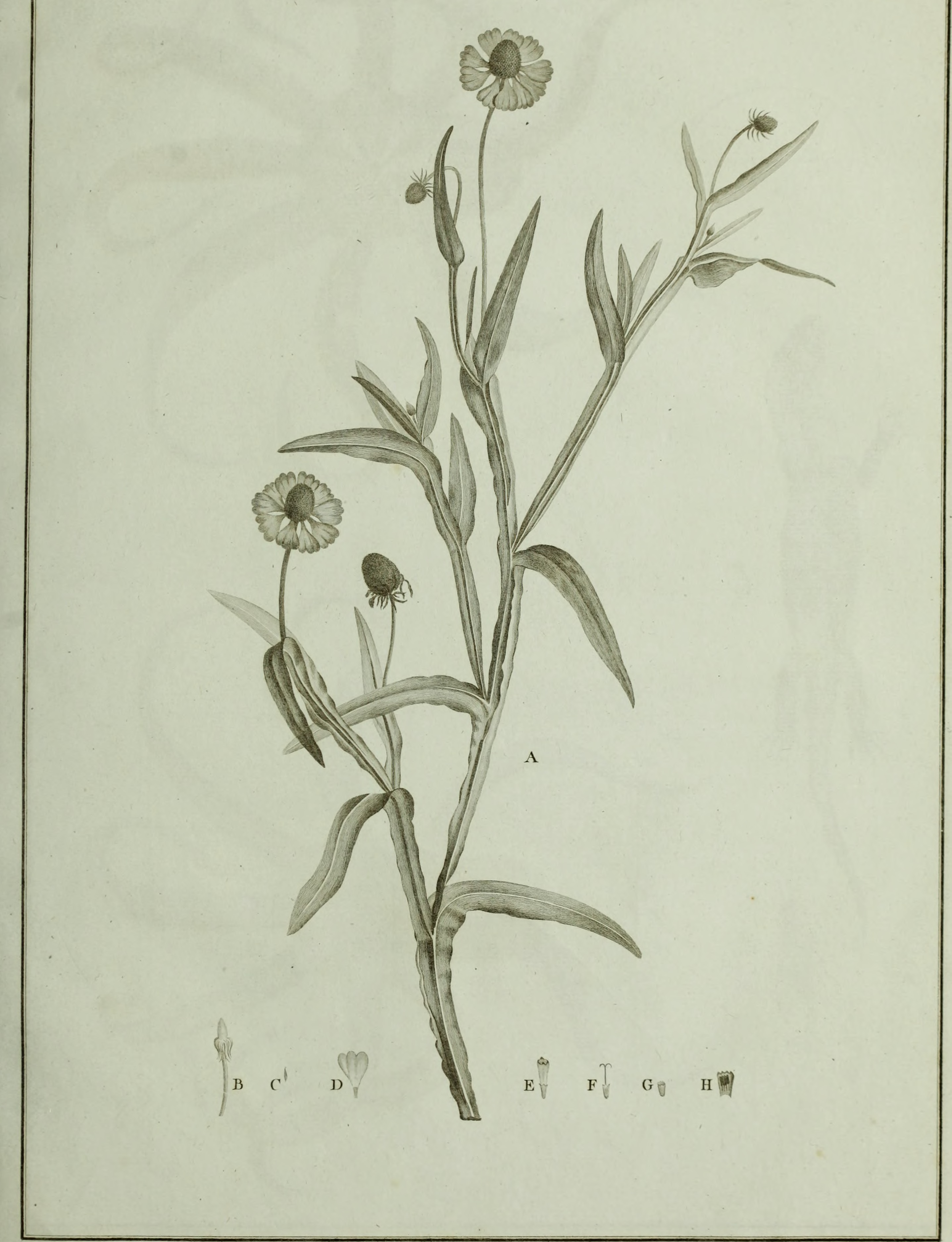
- illustration of Helenium quadridentatum

Conservation status
- Apparently Secure (NatureServe)

Scientific classification
- Kingdom: Plantae
- Clade: Tracheophytes
- Clade: Angiosperms
- Clade: Eudicots
- Clade: Asterids
- Order: Asterales
- Family: Asteraceae
- Genus: Helenium
- Species: H. quadridentatum

Binomial name
- Helenium quadridentatum Labill. 1792

Synonyms
- Heleniastrum quadridentatum (Labill.) Kuntze; Tetrodus quadridentatus (Labill.) Cass. ex Less.

= Helenium quadridentatum =

- Helenium quadridentatum in bloom

Species of flowering plant

Helenium quadridentatum is a North American plant in the family Asteraceae, commonly known as longdisk sneezeweed. It is found in the southeastern and south-central United States (Alabama, Mississippi, Louisiana, Texas, Oklahoma) as well as Mexico (from Tamaulipas to Yucatán), Cuba, Guatemala, and Belize.

Helenium quadridentatum is an annual herb up to 100 cm (39.5 in) tall, with small wings running down the sides of the stems. Leaves are sometimes broadly elliptical, other times very narrow and grass-like. One plant generally produces up to 50 flower heads, in a branching array. Each head has an egg-shaped or conical disc containing can have 500 or more minuscule disc flowers each 1.1–1.8 mm (0.043–0.071 in) across, each yellow toward the bottom but yellow-brown toward the tip. There are also 10-15 yellow ray flowers.
