= Helenium laciniatum =

- Helenium lacinatum in bloom

Scientific classification
- Kingdom: Plantae
- Clade: Tracheophytes
- Clade: Angiosperms
- Clade: Eudicots
- Clade: Asterids
- Order: Asterales
- Family: Asteraceae
- Genus: Helenium
- Species: H. laciniatum

Binomial name
- Helenium laciniatum A.Gray 1874

Species of flowering plant

Helenium laciniatum is a North American perennial plant in the family Asteraceae. It is found in the states of Sinaloa and Sonora in northwestern Mexico.

Helenium laciniatum is a small perennial herb rarely more than 20 cm (8 in) tall. Leaves are pinnately lobed or compound. One plant can produce several flower heads, each on its own long, thin flower stalk.
