= Helenium arizonicum =

- Helenium arizonicum in bloom

Conservation status
- Vulnerable (NatureServe)

Scientific classification
- Kingdom: Plantae
- Clade: Tracheophytes
- Clade: Angiosperms
- Clade: Eudicots
- Clade: Asterids
- Order: Asterales
- Family: Asteraceae
- Genus: Helenium
- Species: H. arizonicum

Binomial name
- Helenium arizonicum S.F.Blake

Species of flowering plant

Helenium arizonicum is a North American perennial plant in the family Asteraceae, commonly known as Arizona sneezeweed. It is native only to Arizona in the Southwestern United States, having been found only in four counties in that state: Apache, Navajo, Gila, and Coconino.

== Description ==
Helenium arizonicum is an annual herb up to 70 cm (28 inches) tall. One plant can produce as many as 25 flower heads, in branching arrays. The head is very nearly spherical or egg-shaped, nearly covered with as many as 700 disc florets, each floret yellow near the base but purple towards the tip. There are also 12-18 ray florets, yellow, sometimes with purple streaks. The species grows along the edges of wet places in ponderosa pine forests.
