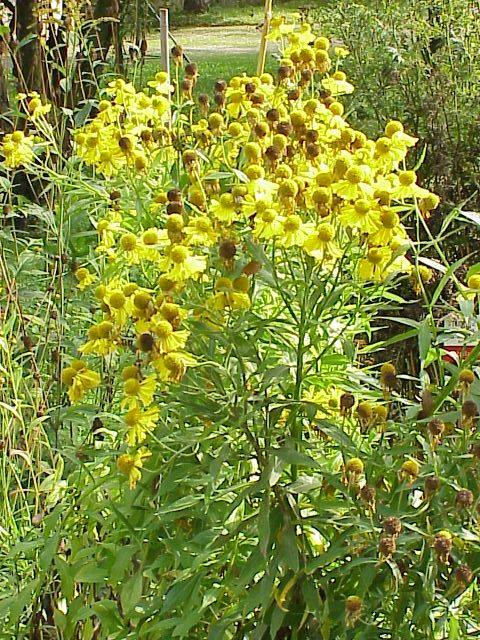
- Helenium autumnale

Scientific classification
- Kingdom: Plantae
- Clade: Tracheophytes
- Clade: Angiosperms
- Clade: Eudicots
- Clade: Asterids
- Order: Asterales
- Family: Asteraceae
- Subfamily: Asteroideae
- Tribe: Helenieae
- Subtribe: Gaillardiinae
- Genus: Helenium; L. 1753 not Mill. 1754

Synonyms
- Oxylepis Benth.; Hecubaea DC.; Mesodetra Raf.; Grahamia Spreng.; Brassavola Adans.; Picradenia Hook.; Cephalophora Cav.; Graemia Hook.; Heleniastrum Heist. ex Fabr.; Actinea Juss.; Actinella Pers.; Leptophora Raf.; Leptopoda Nutt.; Tetrodus Cass.

= Helenium =

Sneezeweeds

Genus of flowering plants in the daisy family

Helenium is a genus of annuals and herbaceous perennial plants in the family Asteraceae, native to the Americas.

They bear yellow or orange daisy-like composite flowers. A number of these species (particularly Helenium autumnale) have the common name sneezeweed, based on the former use of their dried leaves in making snuff. It was inhaled to cause sneezing that would supposedly rid the body of evil spirits. Larger species may grow up to 2 metres (6.6 ft) tall.

The genus is named for Helen of Troy, daughter of Zeus and Leda.

Helenium species are used as food plants by the larvae of some Lepidoptera species including Phymatopus behrensii.

Genus level properties: most conspicuously globe-like disk-shaped flowers, rays three-lobed at tip.

== Species ==
- Helenium amarum (Raf.) H.Rock – eastern + south-central United States, California, Chihuahua, Coahuila, Cuba, Dominican Republic
- Helenium apterum (S.F.Blake) Bierner – Durango
- Helenium argentinum Ariza – Argentina
- Helenium arizonicum S.F.Blake – Arizona
- Helenium aromaticum (Hook.) L.H.Bailey – Chile, Peru
- Helenium atacamense Cabrera – Chile, Peru
- Helenium autumnale L. – much of United States + Canada
- Helenium bigelovii A.Gray – California, Oregon, Arizona
- Helenium bolanderi A.Gray – California, Oregon
- Helenium brevifolium (Nutt.) Alph.Wood – southeastern United States
- Helenium campestre Small – Arkansas, Louisiana
- Helenium chihuahuense Bierner – Chihuahua, Durango
- Helenium donianum (Hook. & Arn.) Seckt – Argentina
- Helenium drummondii H.Rock – Texas, Louisiana
- Helenium elegans DC. – United States (southern Great Plains), northeastern Mexico
- Helenium fimbriatum (Michx.) A.Gray – southeastern United States
- Helenium flexuosum Raf. – eastern + central United States + Canada
- Helenium glaucum (Cav.) Stuntz – Chile
- Helenium hoopesii
- Helenium insulare (Phil.) Cabrera – Chile
- Helenium integrifolium – Guatemala, Mexico
- Helenium laciniatum A.Gray – Sonora, Sinaloa
- Helenium linifolium Rydb. – southern Texas
- Helenium longiaristatum Cuatrec. – Argentina
- Helenium mexicanum Kunth – Mexico, Central America
- Helenium microcephalum DC. – southwestern United States, northeastern Mexico
- Helenium ovallense Bierner – Chile
- Helenium pinnatifidum (Schwein. ex Nutt.) Rydb. – southeastern United States
- Helenium polyphyllum Small – central Mississippi Valley
- Helenium puberulum DC. – Baja California, California, Oregon
- Helenium quadridentatum Labill. – southeastern United States, Mexico, Cuba, Belize
- Helenium radiatum (Less.) Seckt – Uruguay, Argentina
- Helenium scaposum Britton – Cuba
- Helenium scorzonerifolium (DC.) A.Gray – Mexico, Guatemala
- Helenium thurberi A.Gray – Baja California Sur, Sinaloa, Nayarit, Chihuahua, Arizona
- Helenium tinctorium (Molina) J.F.Macbr. – Chile
- Helenium urmenetae (Phil.) Cabrera – Chile
- Helenium vallenariense (Phil.) Bierner – Chile
- Helenium vernale Walter – southeastern United States
- Helenium virginicum S.F.Blake – Virginia, Missouri
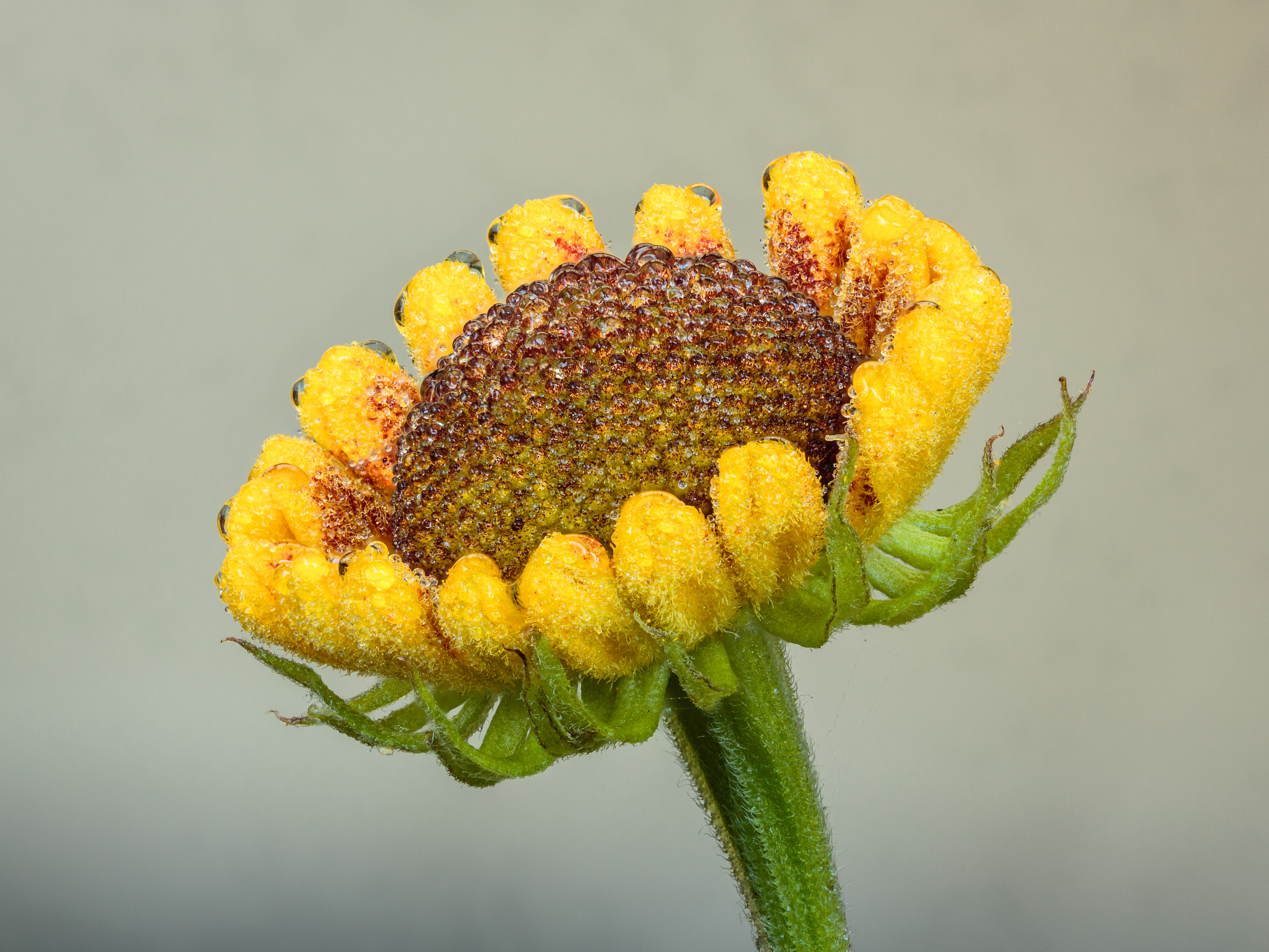
Helenium 'El dorado'

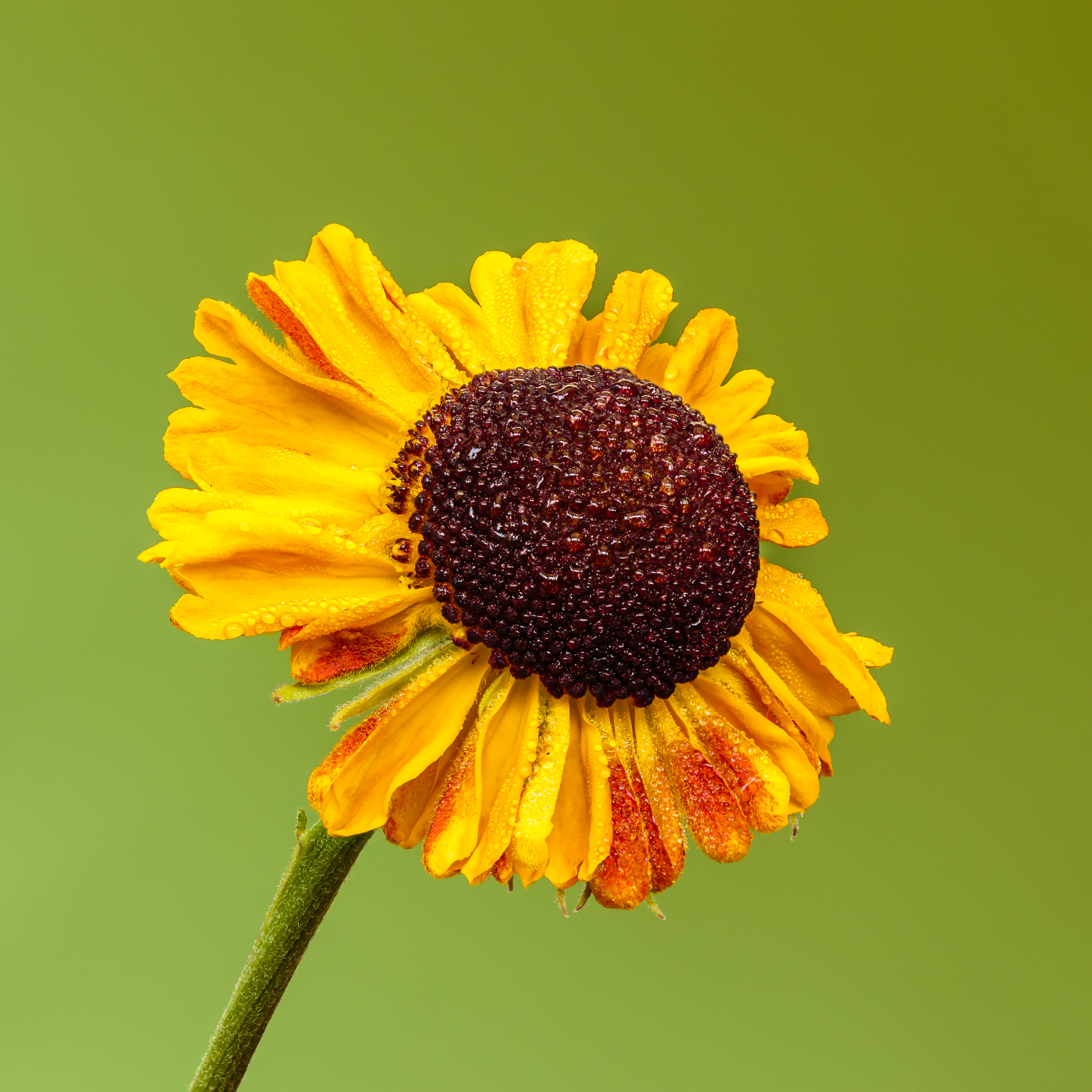
Helenium 'Flamingo'

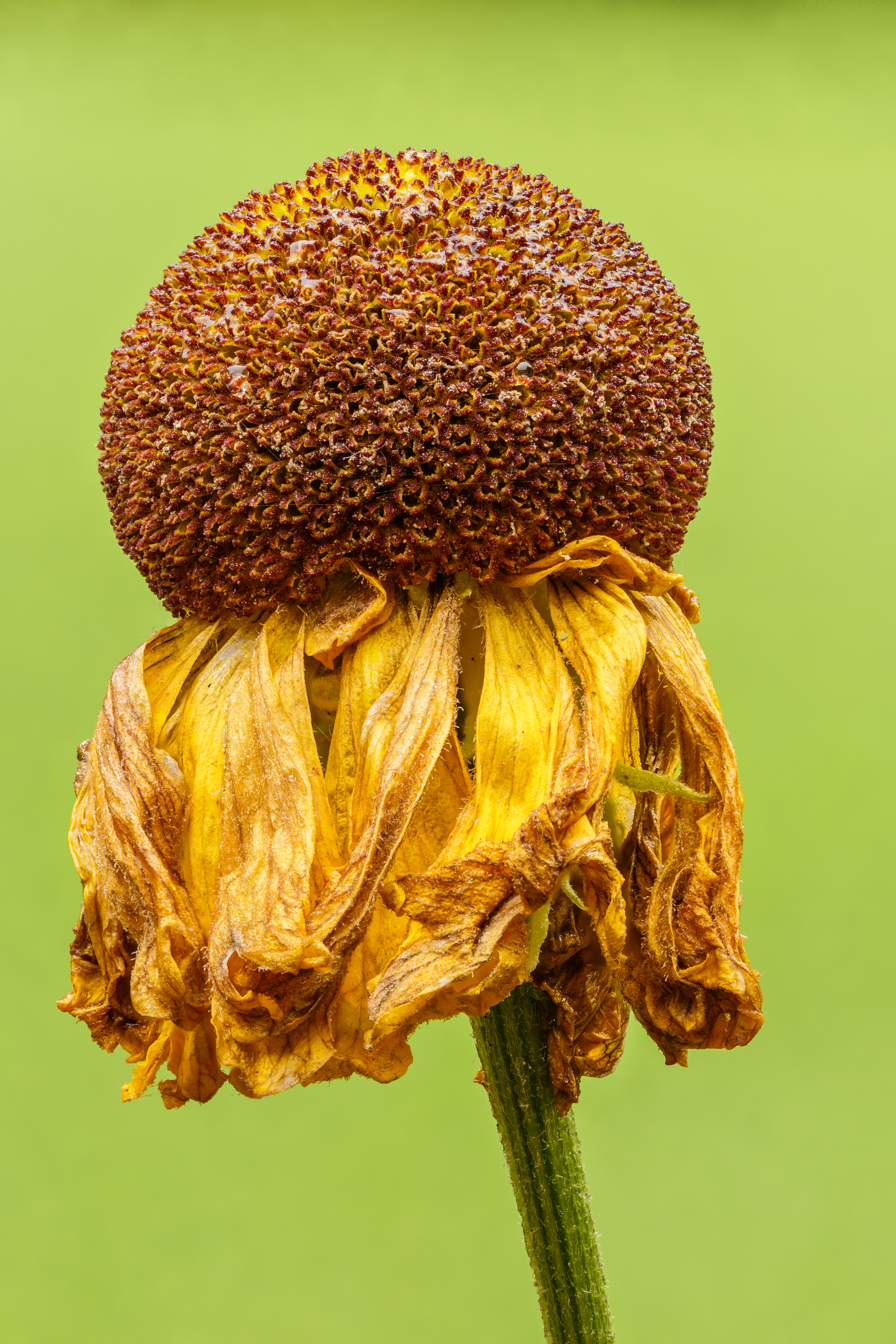
Helenium 'El dorado'

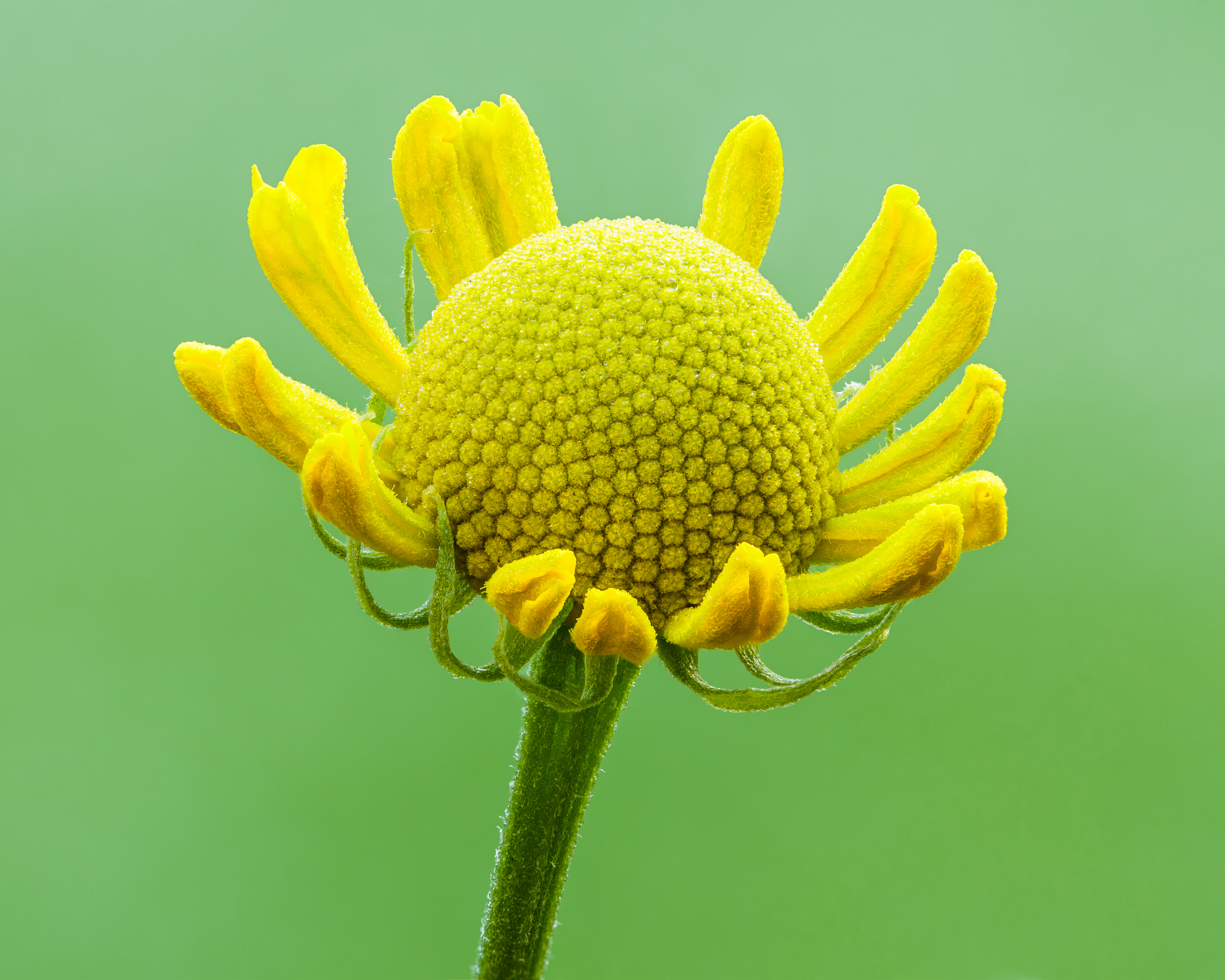
Helenium autumnale

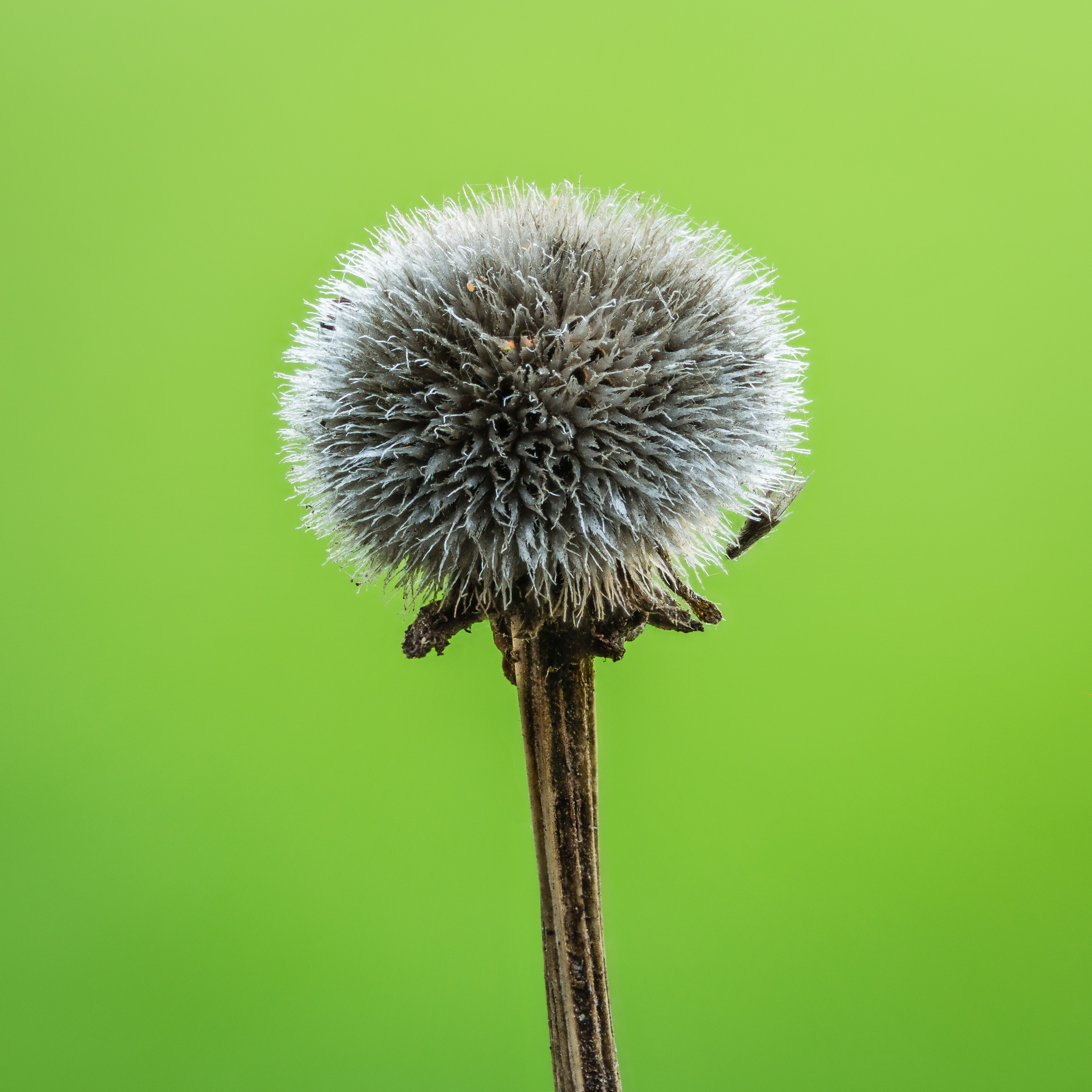
Seed head of a Helenium 'El Dorado' in March

== Cultivation ==
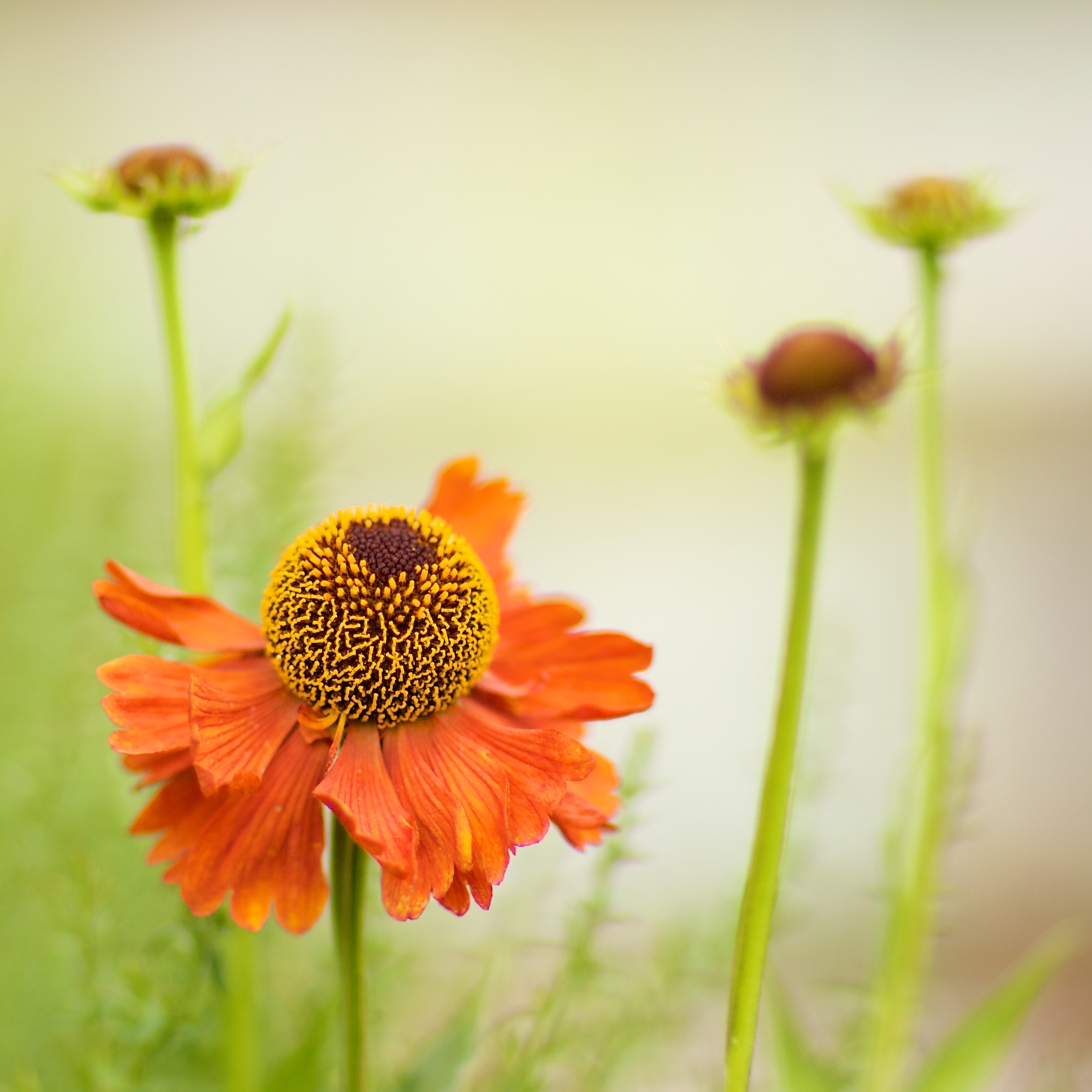
Helenium hybrid 'Moerheim Beauty'

Numerous cultivars have been developed for garden use – mainly from H. autumnale and H. bigelovii. They are useful for late summer and fall bloom, usually in less formal compositions. They are appropriate for native gardens in areas where they are indigenous, and they look wonderfully in bouquets. Annual species are easily grown from seed, and perennials should be divided every year in order to retain their vigor. The soil should be fertile with a generous amount of organic matter in the form of compost, manure or other decayed organic matter in addition to, perhaps, an application of a complete fertilizer in spring. Heleniums should be grown in full sun average to moist soil with good drainage. They are drought tolerant, but should be watered on planting and regularly until established.

=== Cultivars ===
The following have gained the Royal Horticultural Society's Award of Garden Merit:

- 'Baudirektor Linne'
- 'Blütentisch'
- 'Butterpat'
- 'Dunkle Pracht'
- 'Feuersiegel'
- 'Gartensonne'
- 'Karneol'
- 'Moerheim Beauty'
- 'Ring of Fire'
- 'Rubinzwerg'
- 'Sahin's Early Flowerer'
- 'Waltraut'
- 'Wesergold'

The UK National Collection of heleniums is located at Yew Tree House, Hall Lane, Hankelow. near Audlem in Cheshire.
