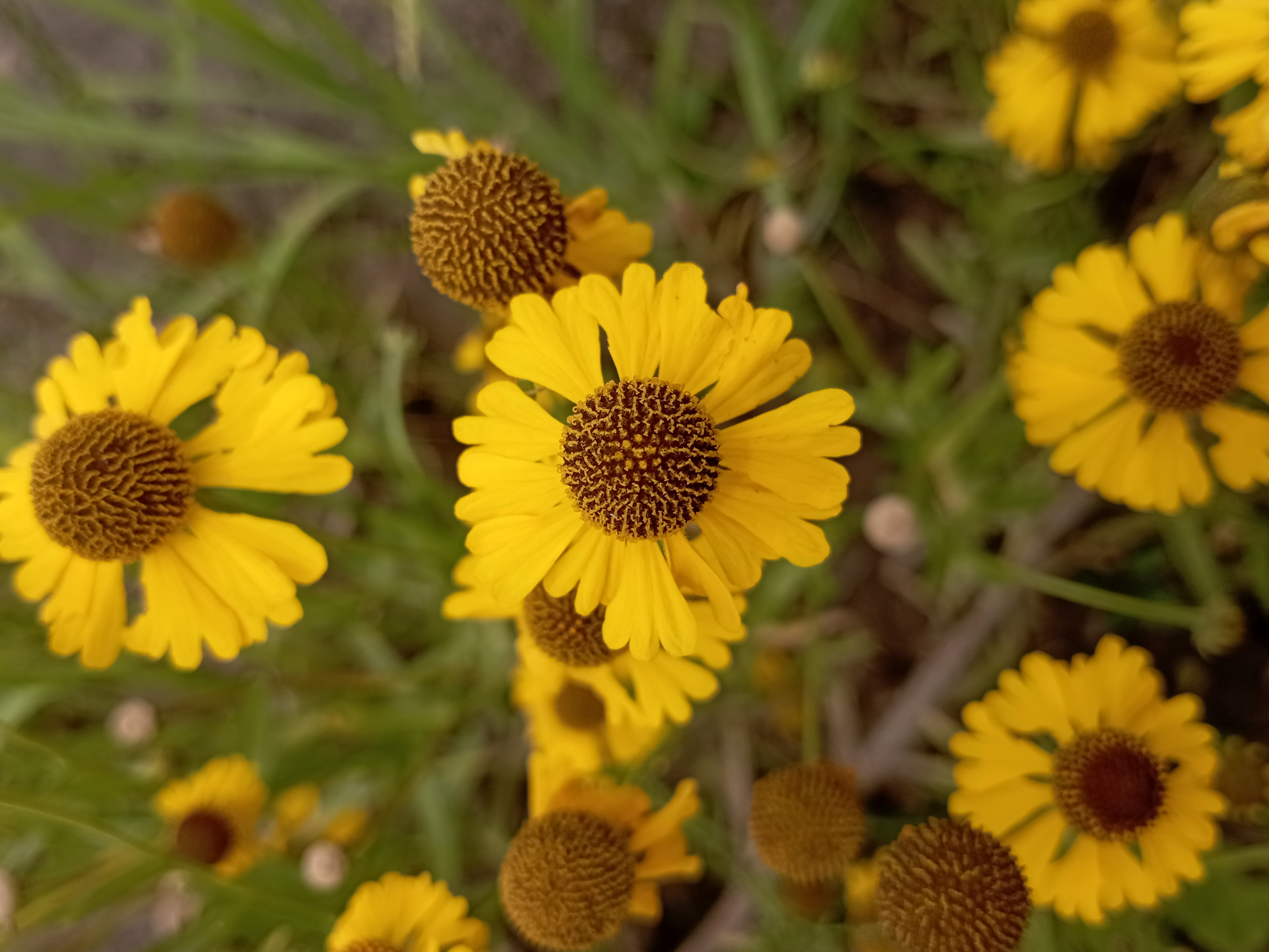

Scientific classification
- Kingdom: Plantae
- Clade: Tracheophytes
- Clade: Angiosperms
- Clade: Eudicots
- Clade: Asterids
- Order: Asterales
- Family: Asteraceae
- Genus: Helenium
- Species: H. mexicanum

Binomial name
- Helenium mexicanum Kunth 1818

Synonyms
- Heleniastrum mexicanum (Kunth) Kuntze; Helenium centrale Rydb.

= Helenium mexicanum =

Species of flowering plant

Helenium mexicanum is a Mesoamerican perennial plant in the sunflower family, common name cabezona. It is native to Mexico and Central America, from Sonora and San Luis Potosí south as far as Costa Rica.

Helenium mexicanum is a perennial herb up to 150 cm (5 feet) tall. One can produce several yellow flower heads, each on its own thin flower stalk. Each head has an almost spherical center covered with many small disc flowers, each one yellow at the base and coffee-brown or red at the tip. There are also 1–17 yellow ray flowers around the edge.
