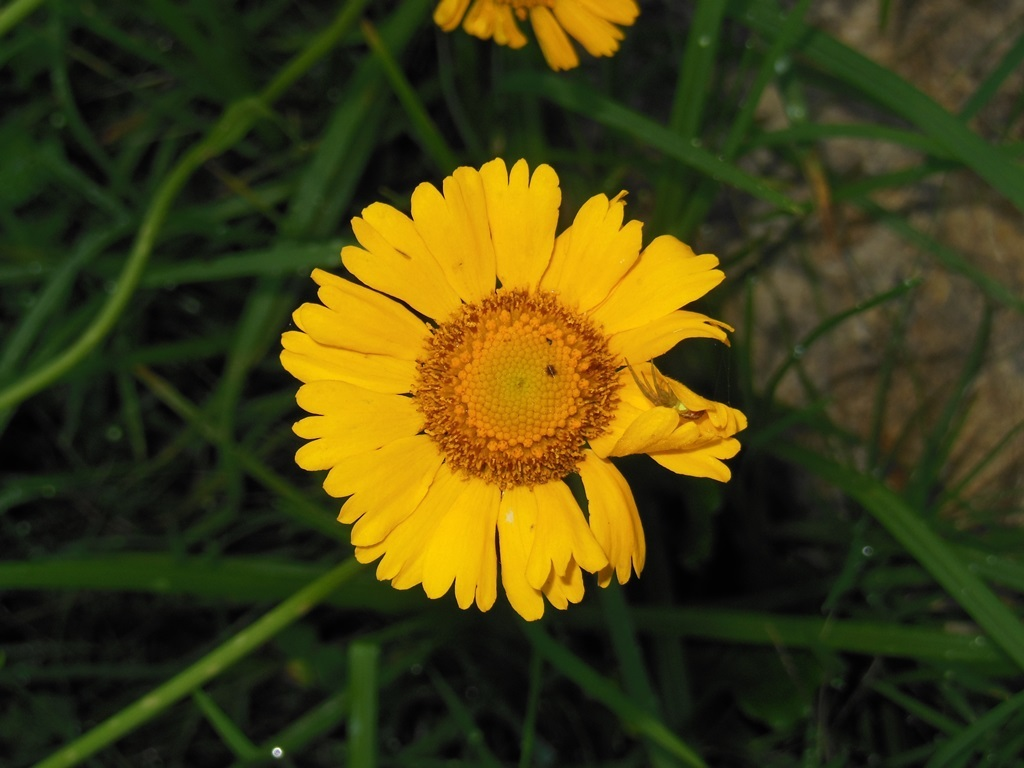

Scientific classification
- Kingdom: Plantae
- Clade: Tracheophytes
- Clade: Angiosperms
- Clade: Eudicots
- Clade: Asterids
- Order: Asterales
- Family: Asteraceae
- Genus: Helenium
- Species: H. scorzonerifolium

Binomial name
- Helenium scorzonerifolium (DC.) A.Gray 1868

Synonyms
- Hecubaea scorzoneraefolia DC. 1836; Hecubaea scorzonerifolia DC. 1836; Helenium scorzoneraefolium (DC.) A.Gray 1836

= Helenium scorzonerifolium =

Species of flowering plant

Helenium scorzonerifolium is a Mesoamerican perennial plant in the sunflower family. It is native to Mexico and Central America, from Jalisco and Durango south as far as Guatemala.
