= Helenium argentinum =

Scientific classification
- Kingdom: Plantae
- Clade: Tracheophytes
- Clade: Angiosperms
- Clade: Eudicots
- Clade: Asterids
- Order: Asterales
- Family: Asteraceae
- Genus: Helenium
- Species: H. argentinum

Binomial name
- Helenium argentinum Ariza

Species of plant

Helenium argentinum is a species of sneezeweed native to Argentina in South America. It grows as an herb, bearing an alternate leaf pattern and daisy-like flowers.
