= Helenium apterum =

Scientific classification
- Kingdom: Plantae
- Clade: Tracheophytes
- Clade: Angiosperms
- Clade: Eudicots
- Clade: Asterids
- Order: Asterales
- Family: Asteraceae
- Genus: Helenium
- Species: H. apterum

Binomial name
- Helenium apterum (S.F.Blake) Bierner 1972

Synonyms
- Hecubaea aptera S.F.Blake 1924

Species of flowering plant

Helenium apterum is a North American perennial plant in the sunflower family. It has been found only in the state of Durango in northwestern Mexico. Turner, B. L. 2013. The comps of Mexico. A systematic account of the family Asteraceae (chapter 11: tribe Helenieae). Phytologia Memoirs 16: 1–100

Helenium apterum is a perennial herb up to 100 cm (40 inches) tall with thick rootstocks producing only one stem with a single flower head. Leaves at the base can be up to 30 cm (1 foot) long, the leaves higher on the stem much smaller. The head is about 4 cm (1.6 inches) across, with a hemispherical yellow disc surrounded by about 14 yellow ray flowers.
