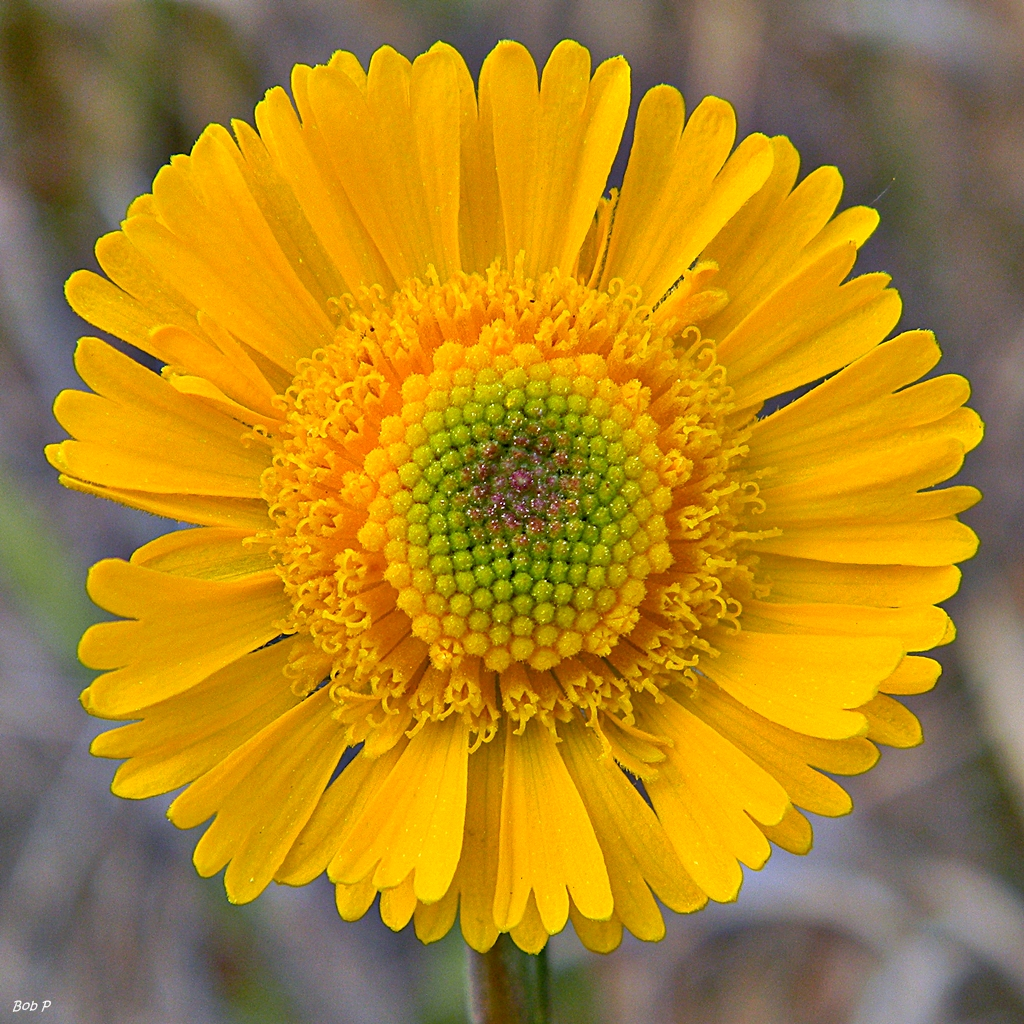

Scientific classification
- Kingdom: Plantae
- Clade: Tracheophytes
- Clade: Angiosperms
- Clade: Eudicots
- Clade: Asterids
- Order: Asterales
- Family: Asteraceae
- Genus: Helenium
- Species: H. pinnatifidum

Binomial name
- Helenium pinnatifidum (Schwein. ex Nutt.) Rydb. 1915

Synonyms
- Leptopoda pinnatifida Schwein. ex Nutt. 1841; Helenium incisum Wood

= Helenium pinnatifidum =

Species of flowering plant

Helenium pinnatifidum is a North American perennial plant in the sunflower family, commonly known as southeastern sneezeweed or savanna sneezeweed. It is found in the southeaster United States (Alabama, Georgia, Florida, and the Carolinas).

Helenium pinnatifidum is a perennial herb up to 80 cm (31.5 in) tall, with small wings running down the sides of the stems. Leaves are pinnatifid, meaning deeply divided into many small parts. One plant generally produces only 1-3 hemispherical flower heads, about 2 cm (1 in) across. Each head can have 800 or more minuscule disc flowers 4.0–5.5 mm (0.16–0.22 in) across, each yellow toward the bottom but yellow-brown toward the tip. There are also 13-34 yellow ray flowers, each with three prominent lobes at the tip.
