= Helenium linifolium =

- Helenium linifolium in bloom
- close-up of the inflorescence

Conservation status
- Apparently Secure (NatureServe)

Scientific classification
- Kingdom: Plantae
- Clade: Tracheophytes
- Clade: Angiosperms
- Clade: Eudicots
- Clade: Asterids
- Order: Asterales
- Family: Asteraceae
- Genus: Helenium
- Species: H. linifolium

Binomial name
- Helenium linifolium Rydb. 1915

Species of flowering plant

Helenium linifolium is a North American perennial plant in the sunflower family, commonly known as slimleaf sneezeweed. It is found only in southern Texas.

Helenium linifolium is an annual herb up to 80 cm (32 inches) tall, with wings running down the sides of the stems. Leaves are long and narrow, almost thread-like, merging with the wings on the stem. One plant can have 100 or more small spherical or egg-shaped flower heads. Each head has up to 500 disc flowers, each yellow-green toward the bottom but brown or purple toward the tip. There are also 8-9 red or yellow ray flowers.
