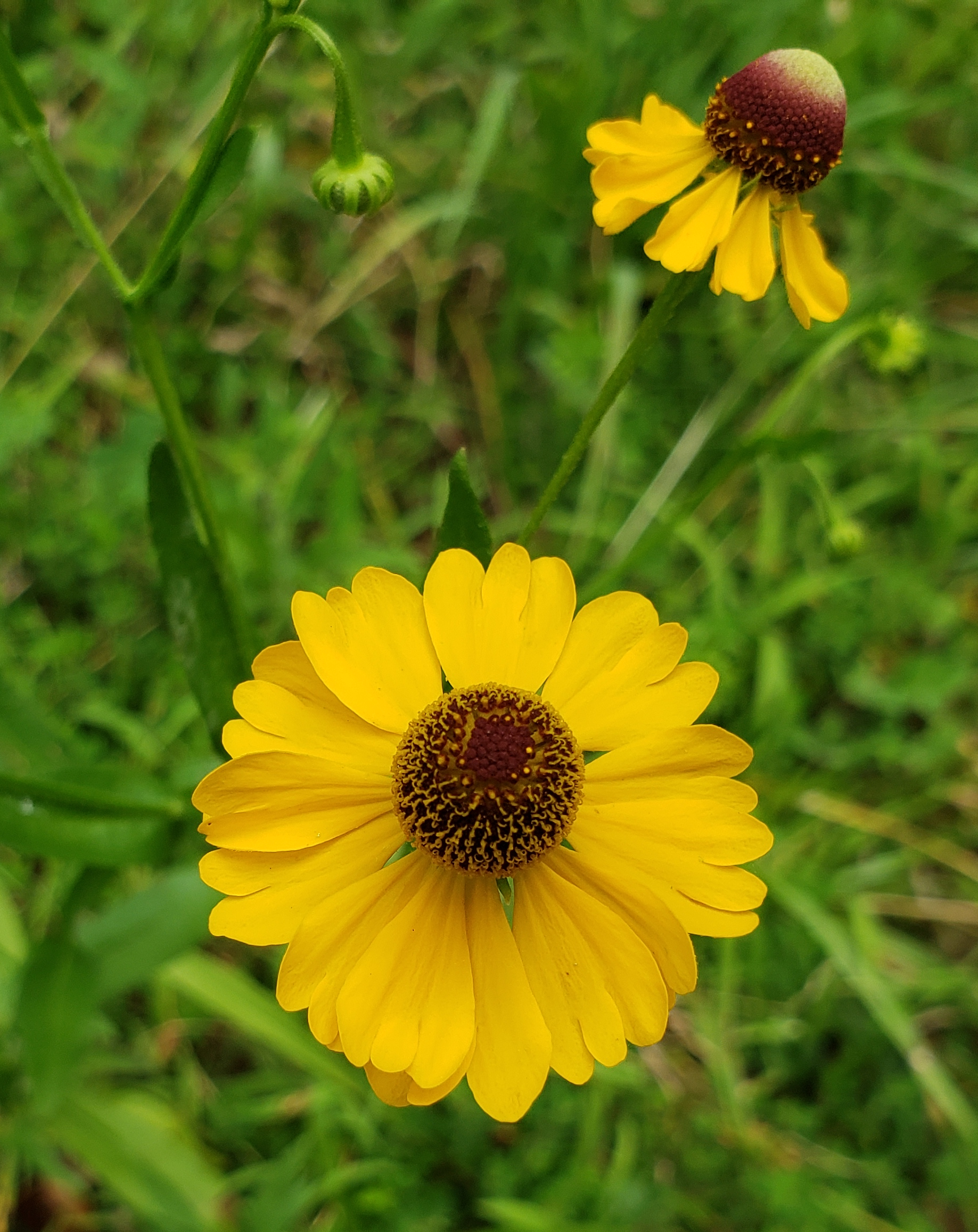

Conservation status
- Secure (NatureServe)

Scientific classification
- Kingdom: Plantae
- Clade: Tracheophytes
- Clade: Angiosperms
- Clade: Eudicots
- Clade: Asterids
- Order: Asterales
- Family: Asteraceae
- Genus: Helenium
- Species: H. flexuosum

Binomial name
- Helenium flexuosum Raf. 1838

Synonyms
- Helenium floridanum Fernald; Helenium godfreyi Fernald; Helenium nudiflorum Nutt.

= Helenium flexuosum =

Species of flowering plant

Helenium flexuosum is a North American plant species in the daisy family known by the common name purple sneezeweed or southern sneezeweed. It is widespread across much of eastern and central United States and Canada, from Nova Scotia west to Ontario, Minnesota, and Kansas, south to Florida, Louisiana, and eastern Texas.

== Description ==
Helenium flexuosum is a perennial herb up to 100 cm (40 inches) tall. One plant can produce 80 or more flower heads in a branching array. Each head has up to 700 yellow or purple disc florets, sometimes with no ray florets, sometimes with 8-13 yellow, red, purple, or brown ray florets. The species grows in fields, ditches, and streambanks.

== Gallery ==
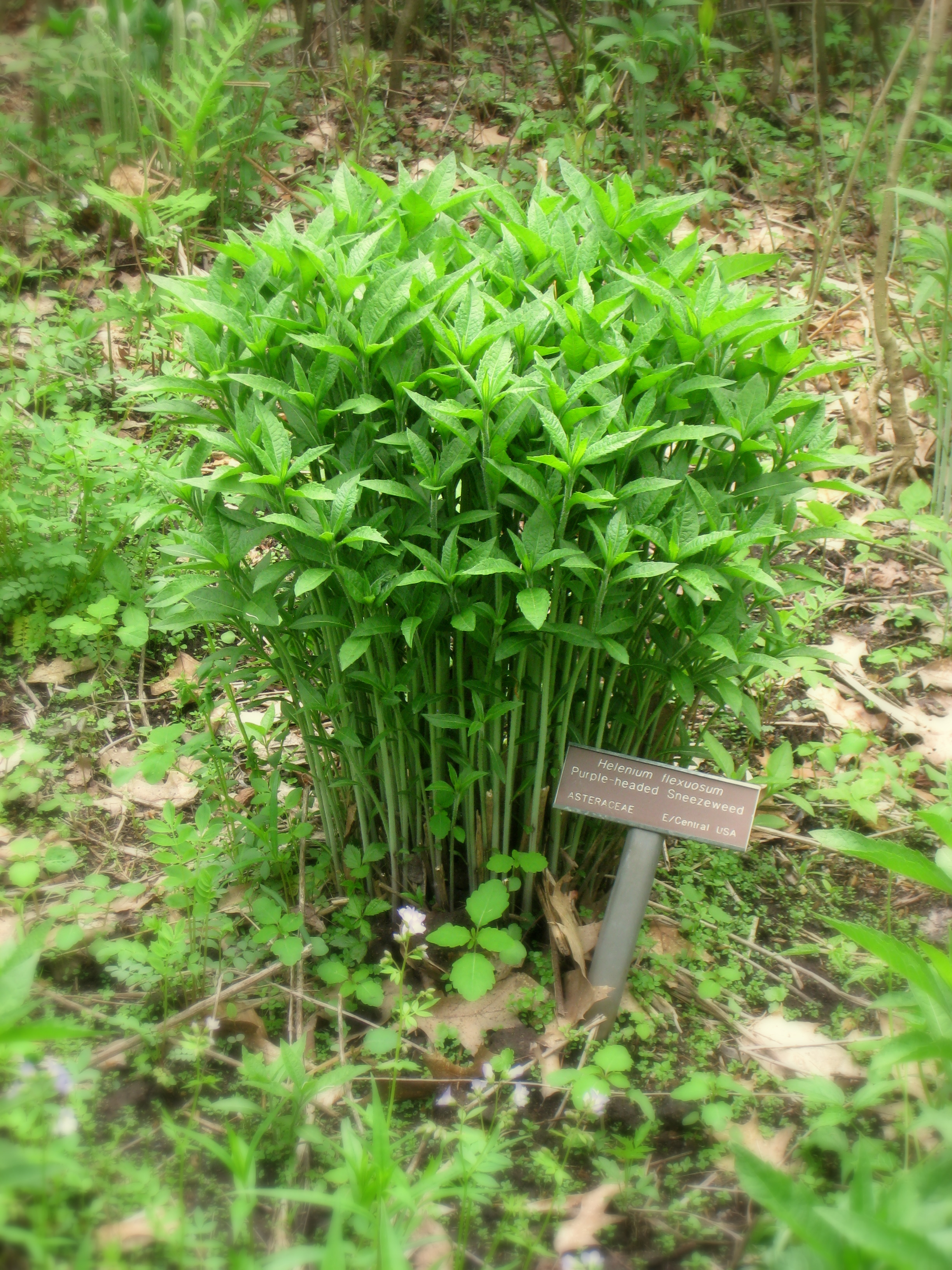

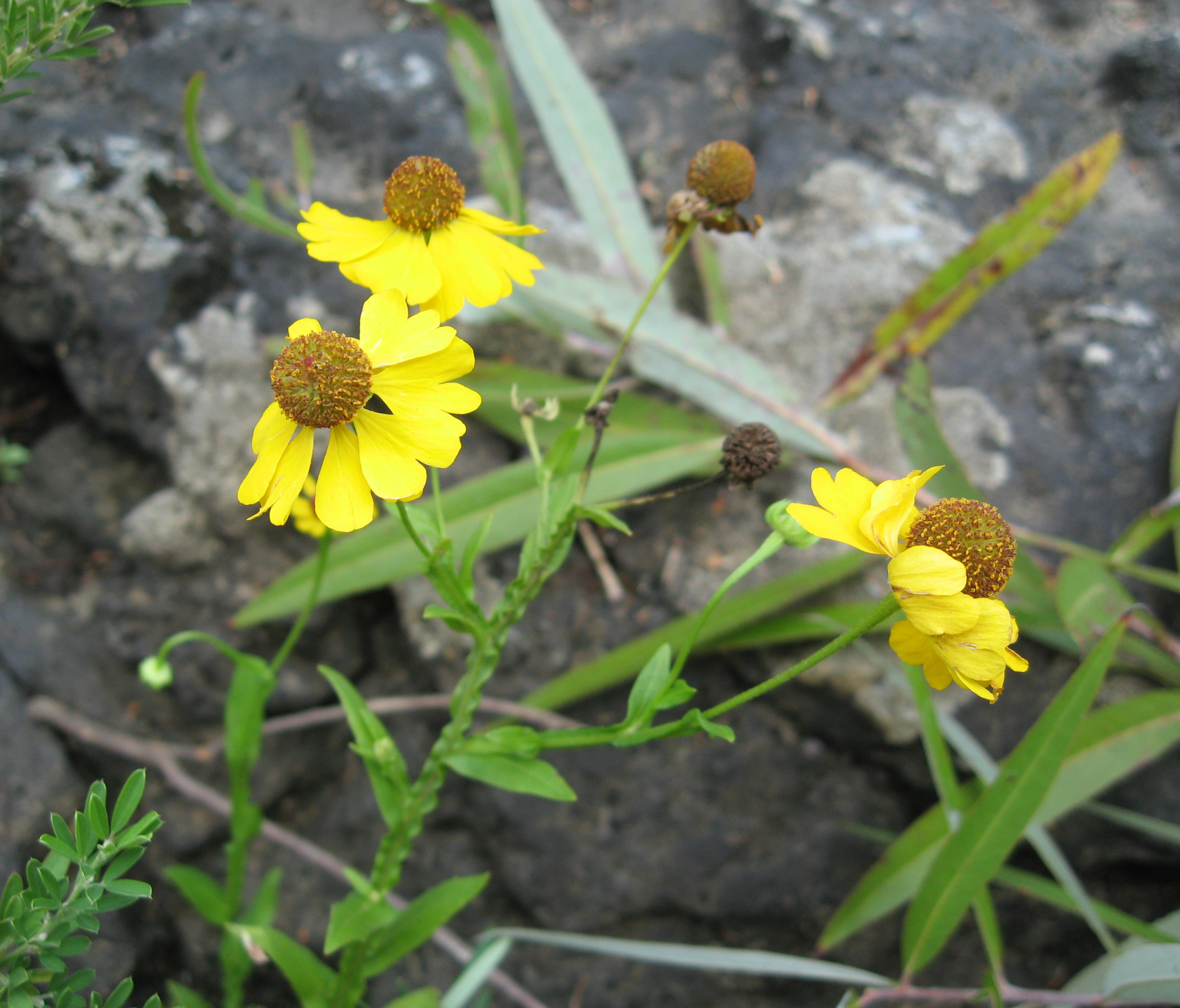

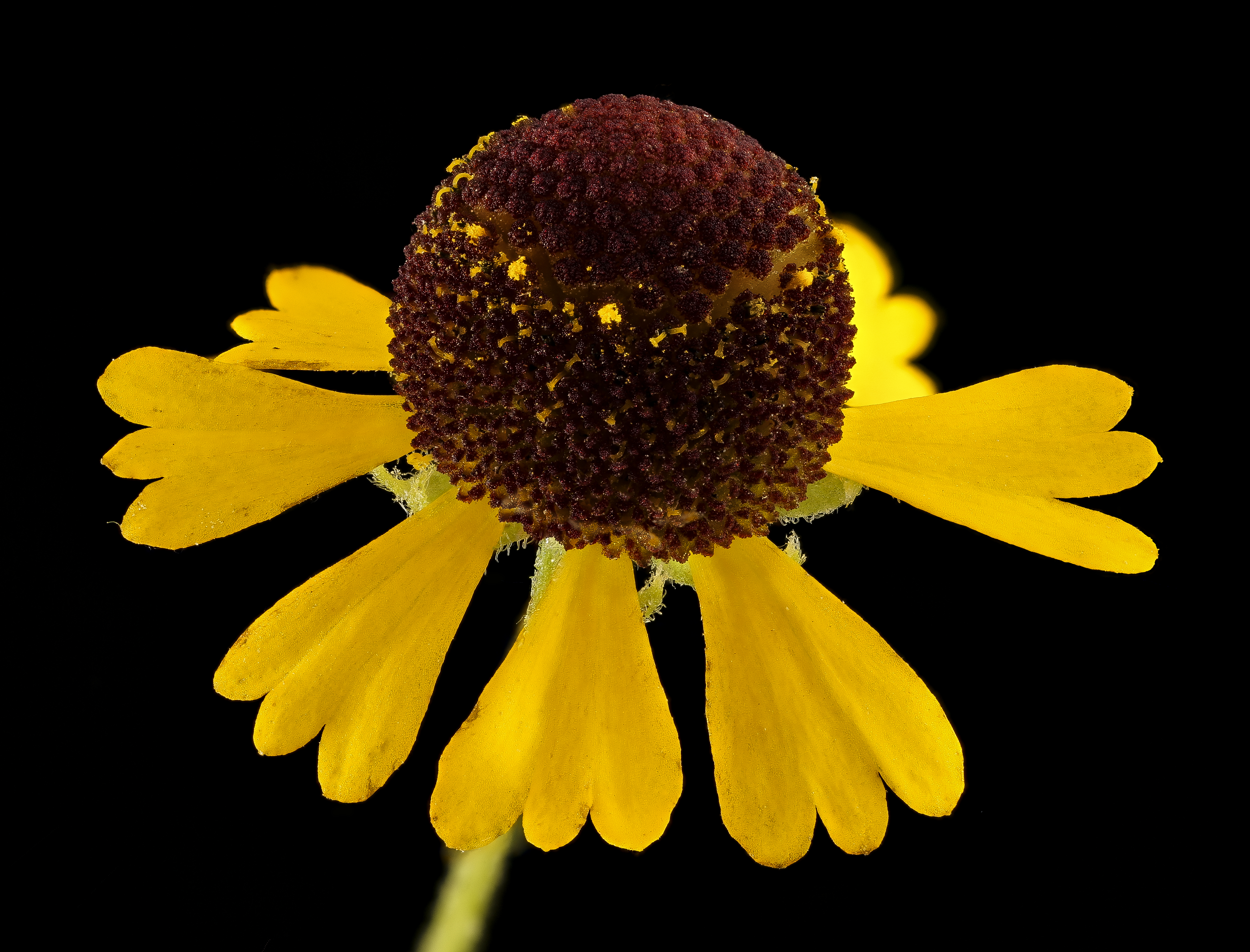

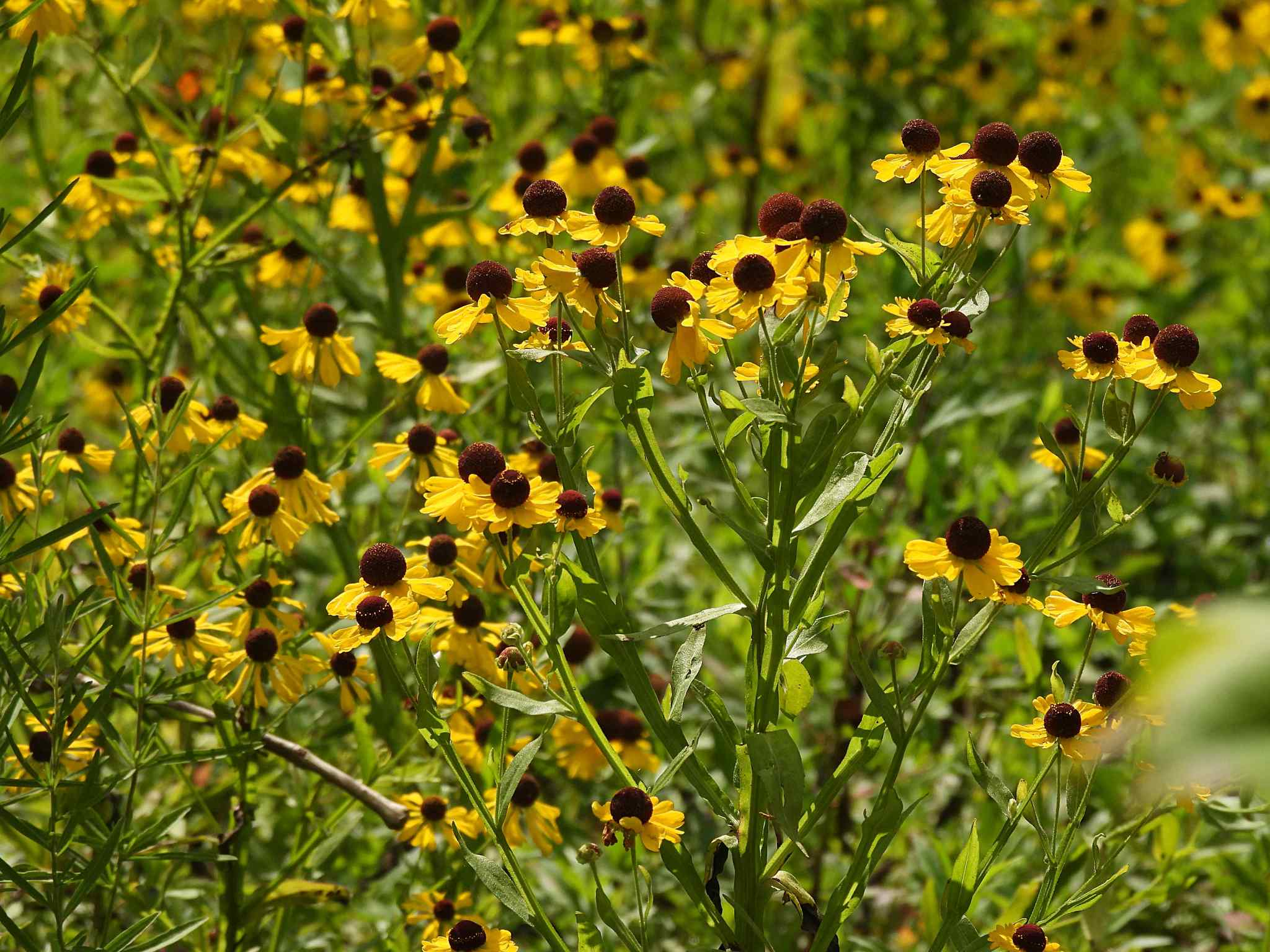
