= Hydroporus lundbergi =

Scientific classification
- Kingdom: Animalia
- Phylum: Arthropoda
- Clade: Pancrustacea
- Class: Insecta
- Order: Coleoptera
- Suborder: Adephaga
- Family: Dytiscidae
- Genus: Hydroporus
- Species: H. lundbergi

Binomial name
- Hydroporus lundbergi Fery & Köksal, 2009

Species of beetle

Hydroporus lundbergi is a species of beetle native to the Doğu Karadeniz Dağlari in Turkey. Males of this species can be distinguished from H. toledoi, H. cagrankaya, H. artvinensis and H. sivrikaya by the shape of their aedeagi. Its pro- and mesotarsi are provided with sucker cups.
