= Hydroporus artvinensis =

Scientific classification
- Kingdom: Animalia
- Phylum: Arthropoda
- Clade: Pancrustacea
- Class: Insecta
- Order: Coleoptera
- Suborder: Adephaga
- Family: Dytiscidae
- Genus: Hydroporus
- Species: H. artvinensis

Binomial name
- Hydroporus artvinensis Fery & Köksal, 2009

Species of beetle

Hydroporus artvinensis is a species of beetles native to the Doğu Karadeniz Dağlari in Turkey. Males of this species can be distinguished from H. toledoi, H. cagrankaya, H. lundbergi and H. sivrikaya by the shape of their aedeagi. Its pro- and mesotarsi are provided with sucker cups.
