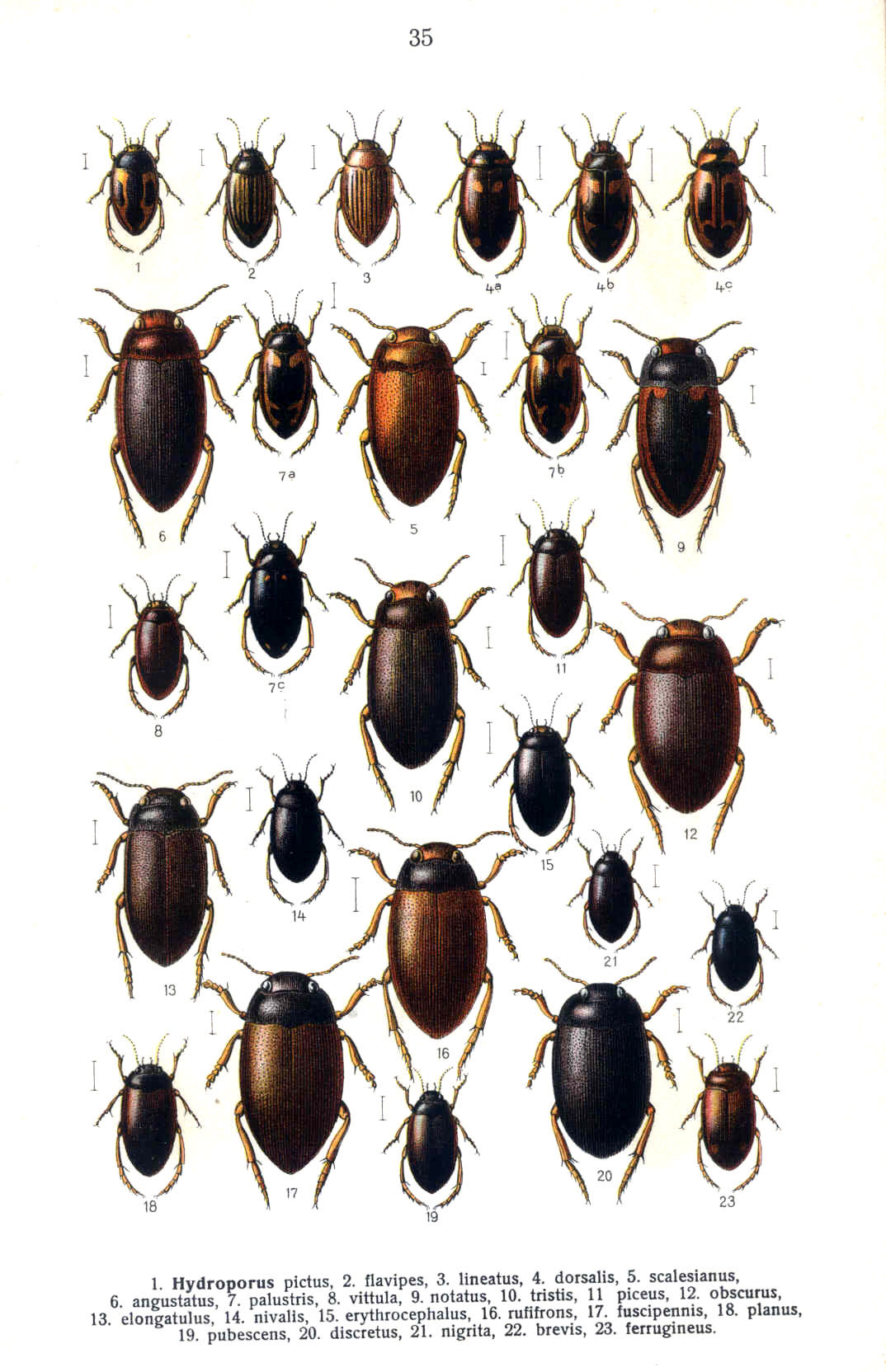

Scientific classification
- Kingdom: Animalia
- Phylum: Arthropoda
- Clade: Pancrustacea
- Class: Insecta
- Order: Coleoptera
- Suborder: Adephaga
- Family: Dytiscidae
- Subfamily: Hydroporinae
- Tribe: Hydroporini
- Genus: Hydroporus
- Species: H. erythrocephalus

Binomial name
- Hydroporus erythrocephalus (Linnaeus, 1758)

Synonyms
- Dytiscus erythrocephalus (Linnaeus, 1758)

= Hydroporus erythrocephalus =

Species of beetle

Hydroporus erythrocephalus is a species of predaceous diving beetle in the family Dytiscidae. It is found in the Palearctic, including Europe and the Near East.
