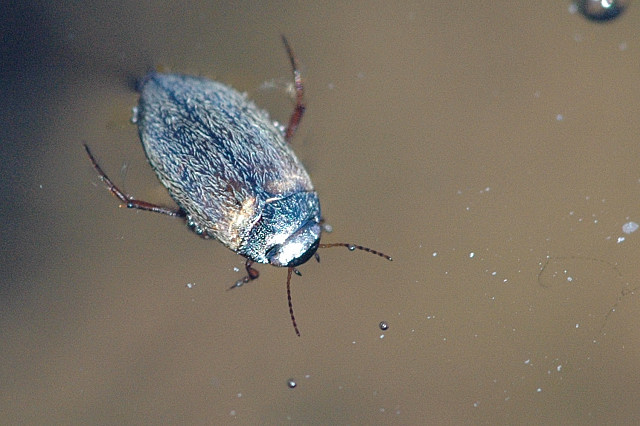
- Hydroporus pubescens

Scientific classification
- Kingdom: Animalia
- Phylum: Arthropoda
- Clade: Pancrustacea
- Class: Insecta
- Order: Coleoptera
- Suborder: Adephaga
- Family: Dytiscidae
- Subfamily: Hydroporinae
- Tribe: Hydroporini
- Genus: Hydroporus; Clairville, 1806

= Hydroporus =

Genus of beetles

Hydroporus is a genus of water beetles native to the Palearctic (including Europe), the Nearctic, the Near East, and North Africa. It contains the following species:

- Hydroporus acutangulus Thomson, 1856
- Hydroporus americanus Aubé, 1838
- Hydroporus amguemensis Shaverdo, 2003
- Hydroporus ampliatus Zaitzev, 1927
- Hydroporus analis Aubé, 1838
- Hydroporus anatolicus J.Balfour-Browne, 1963
- Hydroporus angusi Nilsson, 1990
- Hydroporus angustatus Sturm, 1835
- Hydroporus apenninus Pederzani & Rocchi, 2005
- Hydroporus appalachius Sherman, 1913
- Hydroporus artvinensis Fery & Köksal, 2009
- Hydroporus askalensis Wewalka, 1992
- Hydroporus aurora Larson & Roughley, 2000
- Hydroporus axillaris LeConte, 1853
- Hydroporus badiellus Fall, 1923
- Hydroporus basinotatus Reiche, 1864
- Hydroporus bergmani Nilsson, 1995
- Hydroporus bodemeyeri Ganglbauer, 1900
- Hydroporus boraeorum Larson & Roughley, 2000
- Hydroporus brancoi Rocchi, 1981
- Hydroporus brancuccii Fery, 1987
- Hydroporus brevicornis Fall, 1917
- Hydroporus brevis R.F.Sahlberg, 1834
- Hydroporus breviusculus Poppius, 1905
- Hydroporus brucki Wehncke, 1875
- Hydroporus cagrankaya Fery & Köksal, 2009
- Hydroporus cantabricus Sharp, 1882
- Hydroporus carli Wewalka, 1992
- Hydroporus carrorum Larson, 1975
- Hydroporus civicus Sharp, 1887
- Hydroporus clessini Lomnicki, 1894
- Hydroporus columbianus Fall, 1923
- Hydroporus compunctus Wollaston, 1865
- Hydroporus constantini Hernando & Fresneda, 1996
- Hydroporus crinitisternus Shaverdo & Fery, 2001
- Hydroporus cuprescens K.W.Miller & Fery, 1995
- Hydroporus decipiens Sharp, 1878
- Hydroporus dentellus Fall, 1917
- Hydroporus despectus Sharp, 1882
- Hydroporus dichrous F.E.Melsheimer, 1844
- Hydroporus discretus Fairmaire & Brisout de Barneville, 1859
- Hydroporus distinguendus Desbrochers des Loges, 1871
- Hydroporus dobrogeanus Ienistea, 1962
- Hydroporus edenianus Lesne, 1926
- Hydroporus elongatulus Sturm, 1835
- Hydroporus errans Sharp, 1882
- Hydroporus erythrocephalus (Linnaeus, 1758)
- Hydroporus erzurumensis Erman & Fery, 2000
- Hydroporus falli Blatchley, 1925
- Hydroporus ferrugineus Stephens, 1829
- Hydroporus feryi Wewalka, 1992
- Hydroporus fortis LeConte, 1852
- Hydroporus foveolatus Heer, 1839
- Hydroporus fuscipennis Schaum, 1868
- Hydroporus geniculatus Thomson, 1856
- Hydroporus georgicus Bilyashiwski, 2004
- Hydroporus glabriusculus Aubé, 1838
- Hydroporus glasunovi Zaitzev, 1905
- Hydroporus goldschmidti Gschwendtner, 1923
- Hydroporus gossei Larson & Roughley, 2000
- Hydroporus gueorguievi Wewalka, 1975
- Hydroporus guernei Régimbart, 1891
- Hydroporus gyllenhalii Schiödte, 1841
- Hydroporus hebaueri Hendrich, 1990
- Hydroporus hellenicus Mazzoldi & Toledo, 1992
- Hydroporus humilis Klug, 1834
- Hydroporus hygrotoides Fery, 2000
- Hydroporus ijimai Nilsson & Nakane, 1993
- Hydroporus inanimatus Scudder, 1900
- Hydroporus incognitus Sharp, 1869
- Hydroporus incommodus Fery, 2006
- Hydroporus ineptus Sharp, 1882
- Hydroporus inscitus Sharp, 1882
- Hydroporus inundatus Scudder, 1900
- Hydroporus jacobsoni Zaitzev, 1927
- Hydroporus jonicus L.Miller, 1862
- Hydroporus jurjurensis Régimbart, 1895
- Hydroporus kabakovi Fery & Petrov, 2006
- Hydroporus kasyi Wewalka, 1984
- Hydroporus klamathensis Larson & Roughley, 2000
- Hydroporus kozlovskii Zaitzev, 1927
- Hydroporus kraatzii Schaum, 1868
- Hydroporus kryshtali Bilyashiwski, 1993
- Hydroporus lapideus Riha, 1974
- Hydroporus lapponum (Gyllenhal, 1808)
- Hydroporus larsoni Nilsson, 1984
- Hydroporus laticollis Zimmermann, 1922
- Hydroporus leechi Gordon, 1981
- Hydroporus lenkoranensis Fery, 1999
- Hydroporus libanus Régimbart, 1901
- Hydroporus limbatus Aubé, 1838
- Hydroporus lluci Fery, 1999
- Hydroporus longicornis Sharp, 1871
- Hydroporus longiusculus Gemminger & Harold, 1868
- Hydroporus longulus Mulsant & Rey, 1861
- Hydroporus lucasi Reiche, 1866
- Hydroporus lundbergi Fery & Köksal, 2009
- Hydroporus lundbladi (Falkenström, 1938)
- Hydroporus macedonicus Fery & Pesic, 2006
- Hydroporus mannerheimi J.Balfour-Browne, 1944
- Hydroporus marginatus (Duftschmid, 1805)
- Hydroporus mariannae Wewalka, 1974
- Hydroporus martensi Brancucci, 1981
- Hydroporus melanarius Sturm, 1835
- Hydroporus melsheimeri Fall, 1917
- Hydroporus memnonius Nicolai, 1822
- Hydroporus morio Aubé, 1838
- Hydroporus multiguttatus Régimbart, 1878
- Hydroporus multipunctatus Statz, 1939
- Hydroporus nanpingensis Toledo & Mazzoldi, 1996
- Hydroporus neclae Erman & Fery, 2006
- Hydroporus necopinatus Fery, 1999
- Hydroporus neglectus Schaum, 1845
- Hydroporus nevadensis Sharp, 1882
- Hydroporus nigellus Mannerheim, 1853
- Hydroporus niger Say, 1823
- Hydroporus nigrita (Fabricius, 1792)
- Hydroporus normandi Régimbart, 1903
- Hydroporus notabilis LeConte, 1850
- Hydroporus notatus Sturm, 1835
- Hydroporus oasis Wewalka, 1992
- Hydroporus obscurus Sturm, 1835
- Hydroporus obsoletus Aubé, 1838
- Hydroporus occidentalis Sharp, 1882
- Hydroporus paganettianus Scholz, 1923
- Hydroporus palustris (Linnaeus, 1761)
- Hydroporus pervicinus Fall, 1923
- Hydroporus petrefactus Weyenbergh, 1869
- Hydroporus pfefferi Wewalka, 1974
- Hydroporus pilosus (Guignot, 1949)
- Hydroporus planus (Fabricius, 1782)
- Hydroporus pleistocenicus Lomnicki, 1894
- Hydroporus polaris Fall, 1923
- Hydroporus praedorsalis Lomnicki, 1894
- Hydroporus praenigrita Lomnicki, 1894
- Hydroporus praenivalis Lomnicki, 1894
- Hydroporus productus Fairmaire, 1880
- Hydroporus pseudoniger Nilsson & Fery, 2006
- Hydroporus pseudopubescens Zimmermann, 1919
- Hydroporus puberulus LeConte, 1850
- Hydroporus pubescens (Gyllenhal, 1808)
- Hydroporus punctipennis J.Sahlberg, 1880
- Hydroporus rectus Fall, 1923
- Hydroporus regularis Sharp, 1882
- Hydroporus rufifrons (O.F.Müller, 1776)
- Hydroporus rufilabris Sharp, 1882
- Hydroporus rufinasus Mannerheim, 1852
- Hydroporus sabaudus Fauvel, 1865
- Hydroporus saghaliensis Takizawa, 1933
- Hydroporus sandbergeri Lomnicki, 1894
- Hydroporus sanfilippoi Ghidini, 1958
- Hydroporus sardomontanus Pederzani, Rocchi & Schizzerotto, 2004
- Hydroporus scalesianus Stephens, 1828
- Hydroporus sectus Scudder, 1900
- Hydroporus semenowi Jakovlev, 1897
- Hydroporus sibiricus J.Sahlberg, 1880
- Hydroporus signatus Mannerheim, 1853
- Hydroporus simplex Gordon, 1981
- Hydroporus sinuatipes Fall, 1923
- Hydroporus sivrikaya Fery & Köksal, 2009
- Hydroporus spangleri Gordon, 1981
- Hydroporus springeri J.Müller, 1924
- Hydroporus statzi Nilsson, 2001
- Hydroporus striola (Gyllenhal, 1826)
- Hydroporus subarcticus Lomnicki, 1894
- Hydroporus submuticus Thomson, 1874
- Hydroporus subpubescens LeConte, 1852
- Hydroporus tademus Leech, 1949
- Hydroporus talyschensis Bilyashiwski, 2004
- Hydroporus tartaricus LeConte, 1850
- Hydroporus tatianae Fery & Petrov, 2006
- Hydroporus tenebrosus LeConte, 1850
- Hydroporus teres Sharp, 1882
- Hydroporus tessellatus (Drapiez, 1819)
- Hydroporus theobaldi Nilsson, 2003
- Hydroporus thracicus Guéorguiev, 1966
- Hydroporus tibetanus Zaitzev, 1953
- Hydroporus tokui Satô, 1985
- Hydroporus toledoi Fery & Köksal, 2009
- Hydroporus transgrediens Gschwendtner, 1923
- Hydroporus transpunctatus Chandler, 1941
- Hydroporus tristis (Paykull, 1798)
- Hydroporus tuvaensis Pederzani, 2001
- Hydroporus uenoi Nakane, 1963
- Hydroporus umbrosus (Gyllenhal, 1808)
- Hydroporus vagepictus Fairmaire & Laboulbène, 1855
- Hydroporus vespertinus Fery & Hendrich, 1988
- Hydroporus yakutiae Nilsson, 1990
- Hydroporus zackii Larson & Roughley, 2000
- Hydroporus zimmermanni J.Müller, 1926
