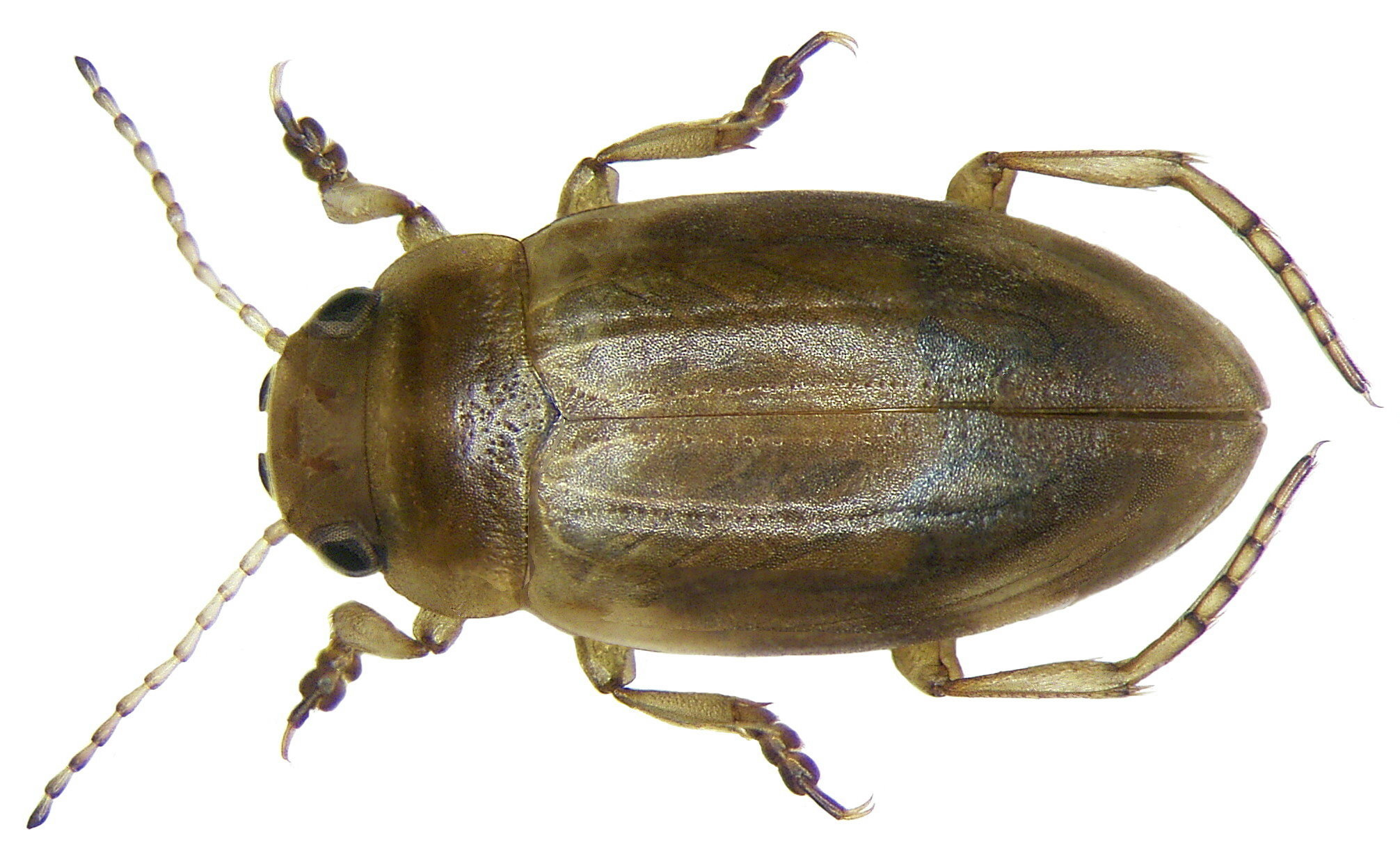
- Nebrioporus martinii

Scientific classification
- Kingdom: Animalia
- Phylum: Arthropoda
- Class: Insecta
- Order: Coleoptera
- Suborder: Adephaga
- Family: Dytiscidae
- Subfamily: Hydroporinae
- Tribe: Hydroporini
- Subtribe: Deronectina
- Genus: Nebrioporus; Régimbart, 1906

= Nebrioporus =

Genus of beetles

Nebrioporus is a genus of beetles in the family Dytiscidae, containing the following species:

- Nebrioporus abyssinicus (Sharp, 1882)
- Nebrioporus acuminatellus (Fairmaire, 1876)
- Nebrioporus airumlus (Kolenati, 1845)
- Nebrioporus anchoralis (Sharp, 1884)
- Nebrioporus assimilis (Paykull, 1798)
- Nebrioporus baeticus (Schaum, 1864)
- Nebrioporus balli (Vazirani, 1970)
- Nebrioporus banajai (Brancucci, 1980)
- Nebrioporus benzeli (Heer, 1862)
- Nebrioporus brownei (Guignot, 1949)
- Nebrioporus bucheti (Régimbart, 1898)
- Nebrioporus canaliculatus (Lacordaire, 1835)
- Nebrioporus canariensis (Bedel, 1881)
- Nebrioporus capensis (Omer-Cooper, 1953)
- Nebrioporus carinatus (Aubé, 1838)
- Nebrioporus ceresyi (Aubé, 1838)
- Nebrioporus clarkii (Wollaston, 1862)
- Nebrioporus cooperi (Omer-Cooper, 1931)
- Nebrioporus croceus Angus, Fresneda & Fery, 1992
- Nebrioporus crotchi (Preudhomme de Borre, 1870)
- Nebrioporus depressus (Fabricius, 1775)
- Nebrioporus dubius (Aubé, 1838)
- Nebrioporus elegans (Panzer, 1794)
- Nebrioporus fabressei (Régimbart, 1901)
- Nebrioporus fenestratus (Germar, 1836)
- Nebrioporus formaster (Zaitzev, 1908)
- Nebrioporus hostilis (Sharp, 1884)
- Nebrioporus indicus (Sharp, 1882)
- Nebrioporus insignis (Klug, 1834)
- Nebrioporus islamiticus (Sharp, 1882)
- Nebrioporus kiliani (Peyerimhoff, 1929)
- Nebrioporus kilimandjarensis (Régimbart, 1906)
- Nebrioporus laeviventris (Reiche & Saulcy, 1855)
- Nebrioporus lanceolatus (Walker, 1871)
- Nebrioporus laticollis (Zimmermann, 1933)
- Nebrioporus luctuosus (Aubé, 1838)
- Nebrioporus lynesi (J.Balfour-Browne, 1947)
- Nebrioporus macronychus (Shirt & Angus, 1992)
- Nebrioporus martinii (Fairmaire, 1858)
- Nebrioporus mascatensis (Régimbart, 1897)
- Nebrioporus melanogrammus (Régimbart, 1899)
- Nebrioporus millingeni (J.Balfour-Browne, 1951)
- Nebrioporus nemethi (Guignot, 1950)
- Nebrioporus nipponicus (Takizawa, 1933)
- Nebrioporus ressli (Wewalka, 1974)
- Nebrioporus rotundatus (LeConte, 1863)
- Nebrioporus sansii (Aubé, 1838)
- Nebrioporus schoedli Fery, Fresneda & Millán, 1996
- Nebrioporus scotti (Omer-Cooper, 1931)
- Nebrioporus seriatus (Sharp, 1882)
- Nebrioporus sichuanensis Hendrich & Mazzoldi, 1995
- Nebrioporus simplicipes (Sharp, 1884)
- Nebrioporus solivagus (Omer-Cooper, 1965)
- Nebrioporus stearinus (Kolenati, 1845)
- Nebrioporus steppensis (Motschulsky, 1860)
- Nebrioporus suavis (Sharp, 1882)
- Nebrioporus sulphuricola (Zaitzev, 1951)
- Nebrioporus tellinii (Régimbart, 1904)
- Nebrioporus turca (Seidlitz, 1887)
- Nebrioporus vagrans (Omer-Cooper, 1953)
- Nebrioporus walkeri (Branden, 1885)
