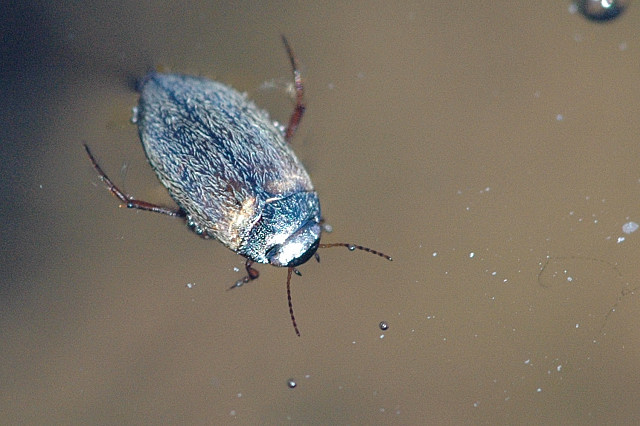
- Hydroporus pubescens

Scientific classification
- Kingdom: Animalia
- Phylum: Arthropoda
- Clade: Pancrustacea
- Class: Insecta
- Order: Coleoptera
- Suborder: Adephaga
- Family: Dytiscidae
- Subfamily: Hydroporinae
- Tribe: Hydroporini
- Genus: Hydroporus
- Species: H. pubescens

Binomial name
- Hydroporus pubescens (Gyllenhaal, 1808)

= Hydroporus pubescens =

Species of beetle

Hydroporus pubescens is a species of predaceous diving beetle in the family Dytiscidae. It is found in the Palearctic.
