= Hydroporus toledoi =

Scientific classification
- Kingdom: Animalia
- Phylum: Arthropoda
- Clade: Pancrustacea
- Class: Insecta
- Order: Coleoptera
- Suborder: Adephaga
- Family: Dytiscidae
- Genus: Hydroporus
- Species: H. toledoi

Binomial name
- Hydroporus toledoi Fery & Köksal, 2009

Species of beetle

Hydroporus toledoi is a species of beetle native to the Doğu Karadeniz Dağlari in Turkey. Males of this species can be distinguished from H. artvinensis, H. cagrankaya, H. lundbergi and H. sivrikaya by the shape of their aedeagi. Its pro- and mesotarsi are provided with sucker cups.
