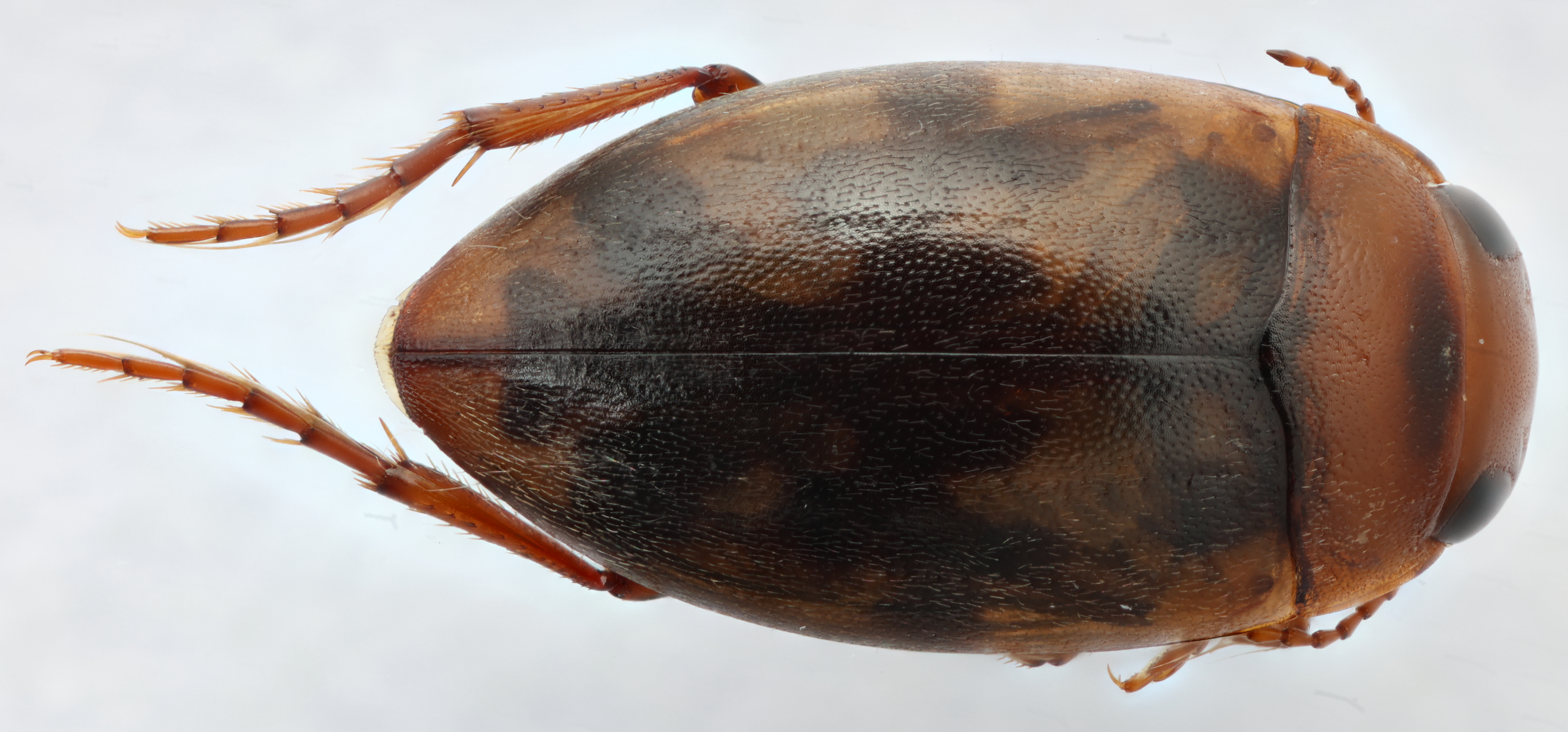

Scientific classification
- Kingdom: Animalia
- Phylum: Arthropoda
- Clade: Pancrustacea
- Class: Insecta
- Order: Coleoptera
- Suborder: Adephaga
- Family: Dytiscidae
- Tribe: Hydroporini
- Genus: Heterosternuta; Strand, 1935

= Heterosternuta =

Genus of beetles

Heterosternuta is a genus of beetles in the family Dytiscidae, containing the following species:

- Heterosternuta allegheniana (Matta & Wolfe, 1979)
- Heterosternuta cocheconis (Fall, 1917)
- Heterosternuta diversicornis (Sharp, 1882)
- Heterosternuta folkertsi (Wolfe & Matta, 1979)
- Heterosternuta jeanneae (Wolfe & Matta, 1979)
- Heterosternuta jenniferae (Wolfe & Matta, 1979)
- Heterosternuta laeta (Leech, 1948)
- Heterosternuta ohionis (Fall, 1917)
- Heterosternuta oppositus (Say, 1823)
- Heterosternuta ouachita (Matta & Wolfe, 1979)
- Heterosternuta phoebeae Wolfe & Harp, 2003
- Heterosternuta pulchra (LeConte, 1855)
- Heterosternuta sulphuria (Matta & Wolfe, 1979)
- Heterosternuta wickhami (Zaitzev, 1908)
