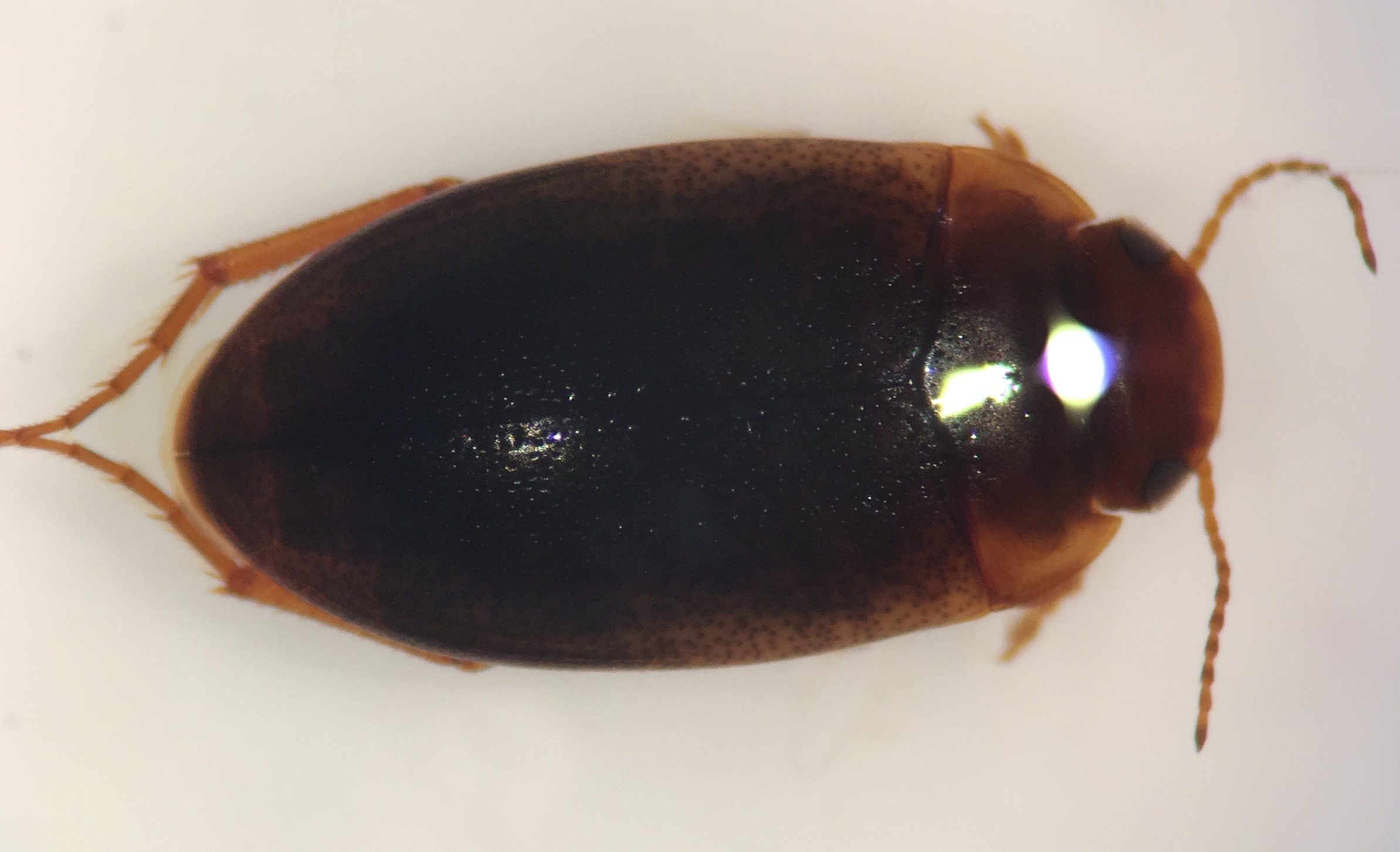

Scientific classification
- Kingdom: Animalia
- Phylum: Arthropoda
- Class: Insecta
- Order: Coleoptera
- Suborder: Adephaga
- Family: Dytiscidae
- Tribe: Hydroporini
- Genus: Hydrocolus; Roughley & Larson, 2000

= Hydrocolus =

Genus of beetles

Hydrocolus is a genus of beetles in the family Dytiscidae, containing the following species:

- Hydrocolus deflatus (Fall, 1923)
- Hydrocolus filiolus (Fall, 1923)
- Hydrocolus heggiensis Ciegler, 2001
- Hydrocolus oblitoides Roughley & Larson, 2000
- Hydrocolus oblitus (Aubé, 1838)
- Hydrocolus paugus (Fall, 1923)
- Hydrocolus persimilis (Crotch, 1873)
- Hydrocolus rubyae (Larson, 1975)
- Hydrocolus rufiplanulus (Fall, 1923)
- Hydrocolus rupinus Roughley & Larson, 2000
- Hydrocolus sahlbergi Nilsson, 2001
- Hydrocolus stagnalis (Gemminger & Harold, 1868)
