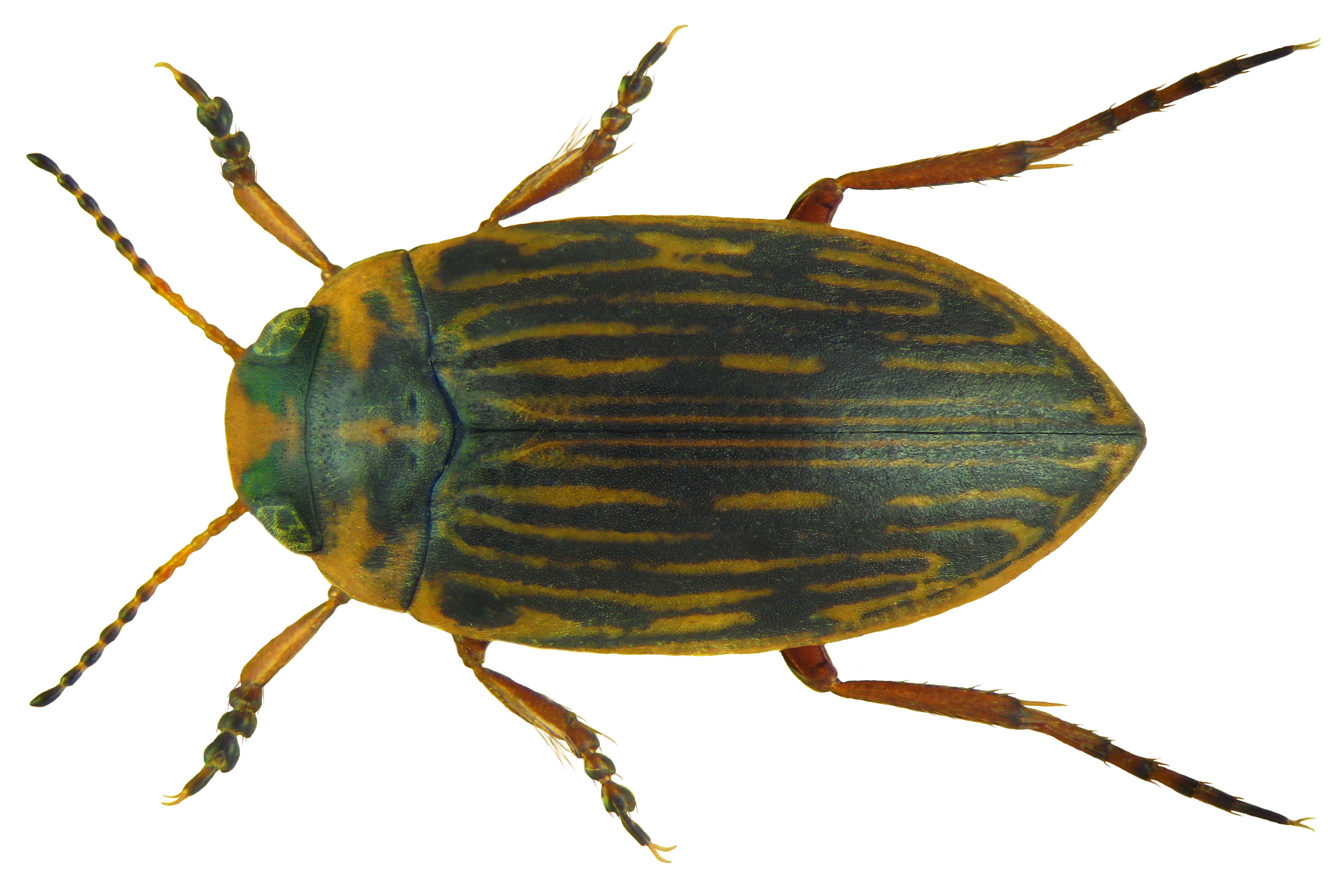
- Stictotarsus griseostriatus

Scientific classification
- Kingdom: Animalia
- Phylum: Arthropoda
- Class: Insecta
- Order: Coleoptera
- Suborder: Adephaga
- Family: Dytiscidae
- Tribe: Hydroporini
- Genus: Stictotarsus; Zimmermann, 1919

= Stictotarsus =

Genus of beetles

Stictotarsus is a genus of beetles in the family Dytiscidae.

Species include:

- Stictotarsus aequinoctialis (Clark, 1862)
- Stictotarsus alpestris Dutton & Angus, 2007
- Stictotarsus bertrandi (Legros, 1956)
- Stictotarsus coelamboides (Fall, 1923)
- Stictotarsus corvinus (Sharp, 1887)
- Stictotarsus creticus Dutton & Angus, 2007
- Stictotarsus decemsignatus (Clark, 1862)
- Stictotarsus deceptus (Fall, 1932)
- Stictotarsus dolerosus (Leech, 1945)
- Stictotarsus duodecimpustulatus (Fabricius, 1792)
- Stictotarsus emmerichi (Falkenström, 1936)
- Stictotarsus eximius (Motschulsky, 1859)
- Stictotarsus expositus (Fall, 1923)
- Stictotarsus falli Nilsson, 2001
- Stictotarsus funereus (Crotch, 1873)
- Stictotarsus grammicus (Sharp, 1887)
- Stictotarsus griseostriatus (De Geer, 1774)
- Stictotarsus ibericus Dutton & Angus, 2007
- Stictotarsus inexpectatus Dutton & Angus, 2007
- Stictotarsus interjectus (Sharp, 1882)
- Stictotarsus macedonicus (Guéorguiev, 1959)
- Stictotarsus maghrebinus Mazzoldi & Toledo, 1998
- Stictotarsus minax (Zimmerman, 1982)
- Stictotarsus minipi (Larson, 1991)
- Stictotarsus multilineatus (Falkenström, 1922)
- Stictotarsus neomexicanus (Zimmerman & A.H.Smith, 1975)
- Stictotarsus opaculus (Sharp, 1882)
- Stictotarsus panaminti (Fall, 1923)
- Stictotarsus procerus (Aubé, 1838)
- Stictotarsus riberae Dutton & Angus, 2007
- Stictotarsus roffii (Clark, 1862)
- Stictotarsus spectabilis (Zimmerman, 1982)
- Stictotarsus spenceri (Leech, 1945)
- Stictotarsus striatellus (LeConte, 1852)
- Stictotarsus titulus (Leech, 1945)
