= Hydroporus cagrankaya =

Scientific classification
- Kingdom: Animalia
- Phylum: Arthropoda
- Clade: Pancrustacea
- Class: Insecta
- Order: Coleoptera
- Suborder: Adephaga
- Family: Dytiscidae
- Genus: Hydroporus
- Species: H. cagrankaya

Binomial name
- Hydroporus cagrankaya Fery & Köksal, 2009

Species of beetle

Hydroporus cagrankaya is a species of beetle native to the Doğu Karadeniz Dağları in Turkey. Males of this species can be distinguished from H. toledoi, H. artvinensis, H. lundbergi and H. sivrikaya by the shape of their aedeagi. Its pro- and mesotarsi are provided with sucker cups.
