= Hydroporus sivrikaya =

Scientific classification
- Kingdom: Animalia
- Phylum: Arthropoda
- Clade: Pancrustacea
- Class: Insecta
- Order: Coleoptera
- Suborder: Adephaga
- Family: Dytiscidae
- Genus: Hydroporus
- Species: H. sivrikaya

Binomial name
- Hydroporus sivrikaya Fery & Köksal, 2009

Species of beetle

Hydroporus sivrikaya is a species of beetle native to the Doğu Karadeniz Dağlari in Turkey. Males of this species can be distinguished from H. toledoi, H. cagrankaya, H. lundbergi and H. artvinensis by the shape of their aedeagi. Its pro- and mesotarsi are provided with sucker cups.
