= Hydroporus pilosus =

Conservation status
- Endangered (IUCN 2.3)

Scientific classification
- Kingdom: Animalia
- Phylum: Arthropoda
- Clade: Pancrustacea
- Class: Insecta
- Order: Coleoptera
- Suborder: Adephaga
- Family: Dytiscidae
- Subfamily: Hydroporinae
- Tribe: Hydroporini
- Genus: Hydroporus
- Species: H. pilosus

Binomial name
- Hydroporus pilosus (Guignot, 1949)

Synonyms
- Hydrotarsus pilosus Guignot, 1949

Species of beetle

Hydroporus pilosus is a species of predaceous diving beetle in the family Dytiscidae. It is endemic to the Canary Islands.

IUCN lists this species as "endangered" under its previous genus, Hydrotarsus .
