= Hydrocolus stagnalis =

Scientific classification
- Domain: Eukaryota
- Kingdom: Animalia
- Phylum: Arthropoda
- Class: Insecta
- Order: Coleoptera
- Suborder: Adephaga
- Family: Dytiscidae
- Genus: Hydrocolus
- Species: H. stagnalis

Binomial name
- Hydrocolus stagnalis (Gemminger & Harold, 1868)

Synonyms
- Hydroporus stagnalis Gemminger and Harold, 1868

Species of beetle

Hydrocolus stagnalis, the hydroporus diving beetle, is a species of predaceous diving beetle in the family Dytiscidae. It is found in North America.
