= Heterosternuta pulchra =

Scientific classification
- Kingdom: Animalia
- Phylum: Arthropoda
- Class: Insecta
- Order: Coleoptera
- Suborder: Adephaga
- Family: Dytiscidae
- Genus: Heterosternuta
- Species: H. pulchra

Binomial name
- Heterosternuta pulchra (LeConte, 1855)

Synonyms
- Hydroporus pulcher LeConte, 1855

Species of beetle

Heterosternuta pulchra is a species of predaceous diving beetle in the family Dytiscidae. It is found in North America.
