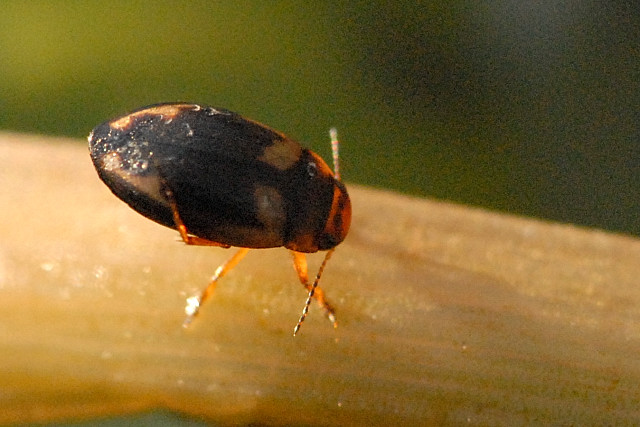
- Hydroporus palustris

Scientific classification
- Kingdom: Animalia
- Phylum: Arthropoda
- Clade: Pancrustacea
- Class: Insecta
- Order: Coleoptera
- Suborder: Adephaga
- Family: Dytiscidae
- Genus: Hydroporus
- Species: H. palustris

Binomial name
- Hydroporus palustris (Linnaeus, 1761)

= Hydroporus palustris =

Species of beetle

Hydroporus palustris is a species of ground beetle native to the Palearctic (including Europe) and the Near East. In Europe, it is found in Andorra, Austria, Belarus, Belgium, Bosnia and Herzegovina, Bulgaria, Corsica, Croatia, the Czech Republic, mainland Denmark, Estonia, the Faroe Islands, Finland, mainland France, Germany, mainland Greece, Hungary, mainland Italy, Ireland, Kaliningrad, Latvia, Liechtenstein, Lithuania, Luxembourg, North Macedonia, mainland Norway, Poland, Russia, Sardinia, Sicily, Slovakia, Slovenia, mainland Spain, Sweden, Switzerland, the Netherlands, Ukraine, the United Kingdom, and Yugoslavia.
