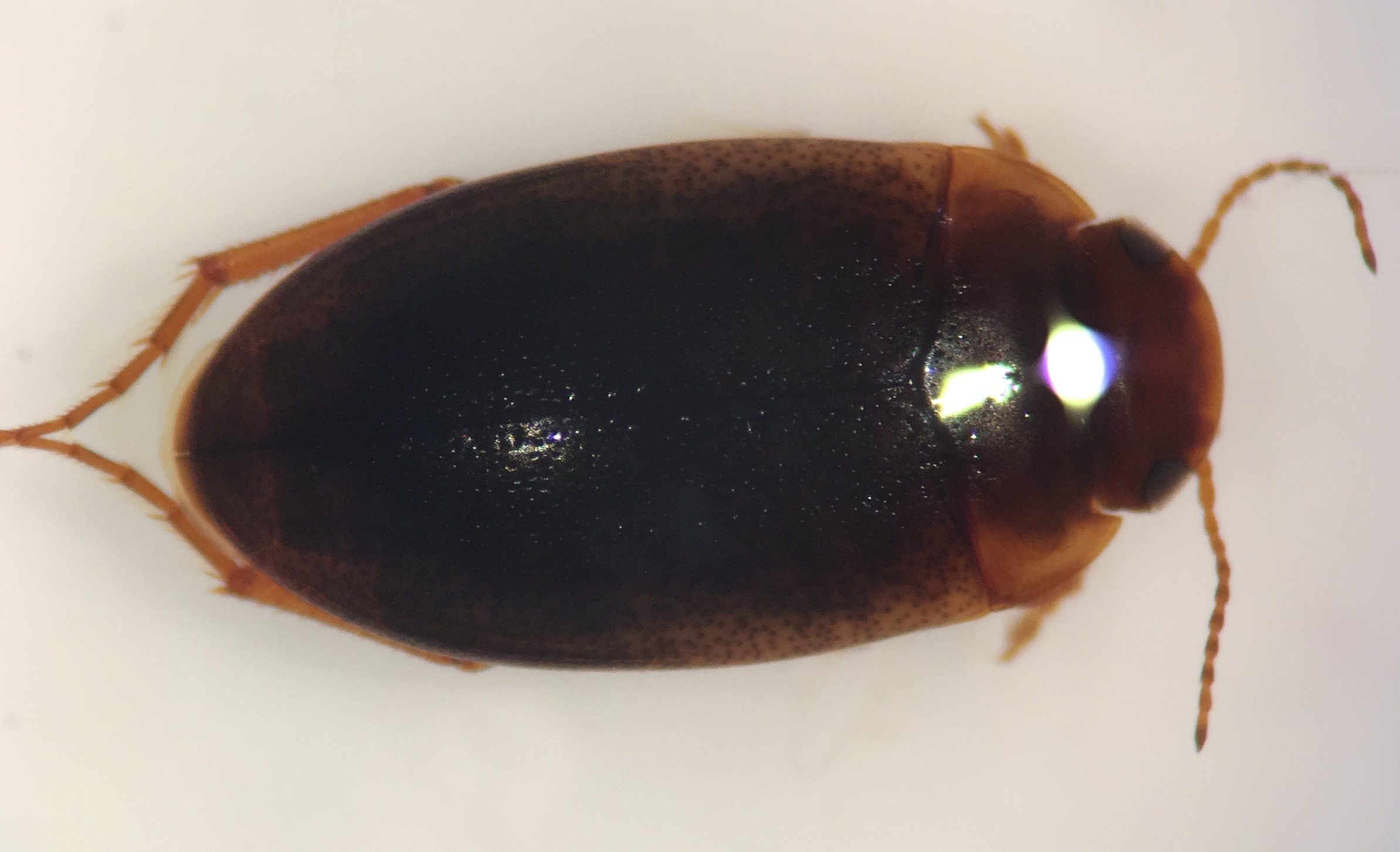

Scientific classification
- Domain: Eukaryota
- Kingdom: Animalia
- Phylum: Arthropoda
- Class: Insecta
- Order: Coleoptera
- Suborder: Adephaga
- Family: Dytiscidae
- Genus: Hydrocolus
- Species: H. deflatus

Binomial name
- Hydrocolus deflatus (Fall, 1923)

Synonyms
- Hydroporus deflatus Fall, 1923

= Hydrocolus deflatus =

Species of beetle

Hydrocolus deflatus is a species of predaceous diving beetle in the family Dytiscidae. It is found in North America.
