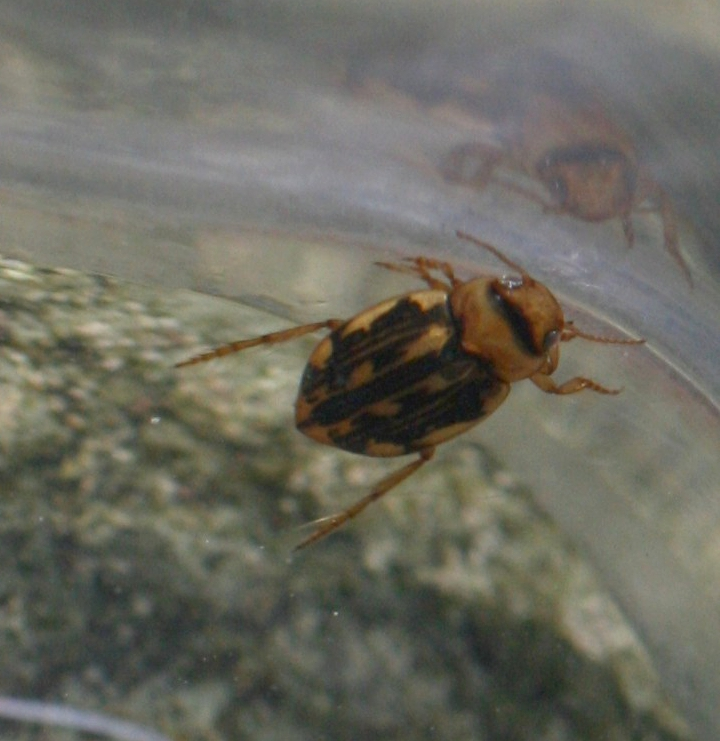
- Nebrioporus depressus in East Lothian, Scotland

Scientific classification
- Kingdom: Animalia
- Phylum: Arthropoda
- Class: Insecta
- Order: Coleoptera
- Suborder: Adephaga
- Family: Dytiscidae
- Genus: Nebrioporus
- Species: N. depressus

Binomial name
- Nebrioporus depressus (Fabricius, 1775)

= Nebrioporus depressus =

Species of beetle

Nebrioporus depressus is a species of predaceous diving beetle in the family Dytiscidae. It is found in Europe and Northern Asia (excluding China) and North America.
