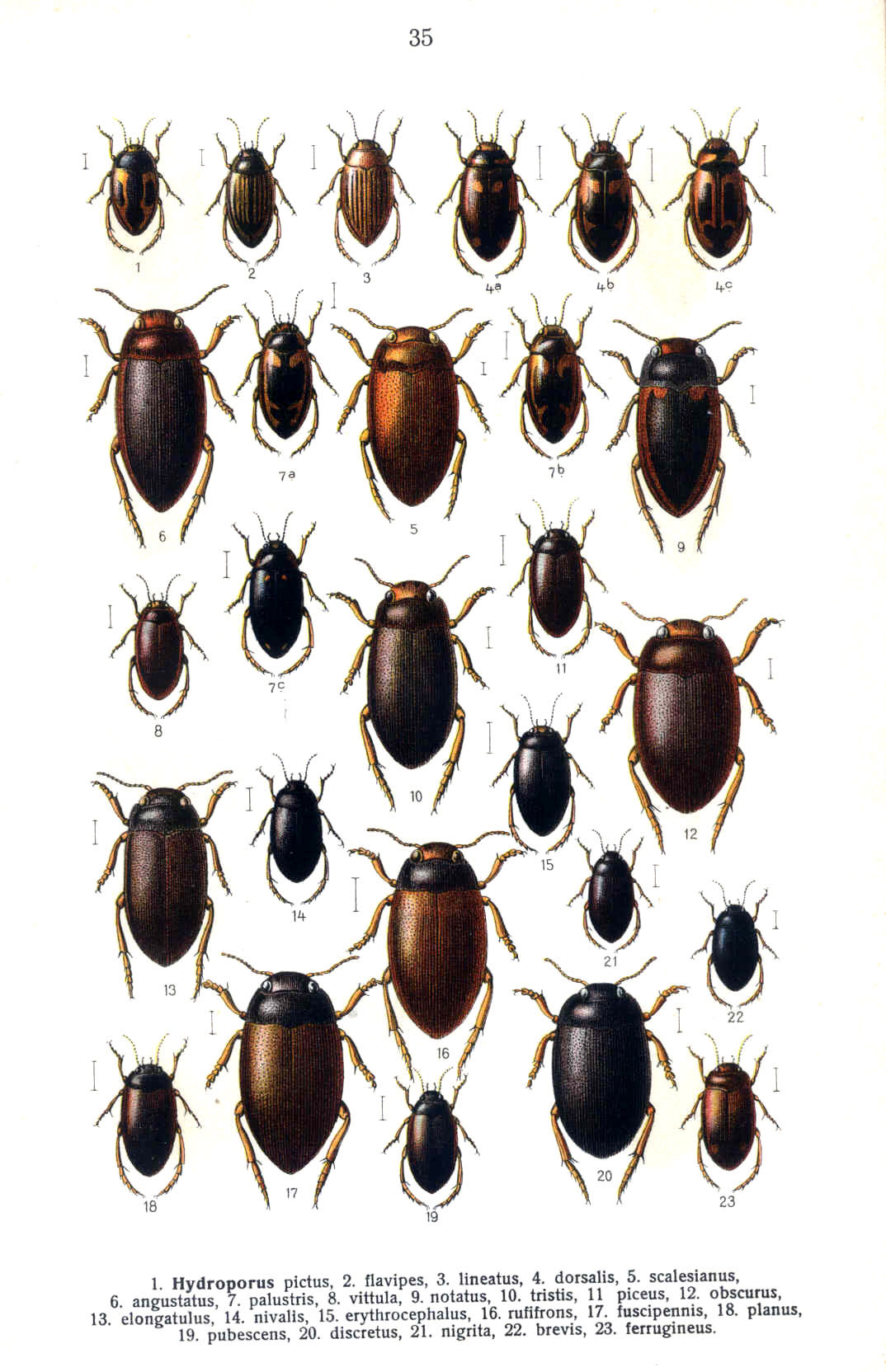
- Assorted hydroporus beetles

Scientific classification
- Kingdom: Animalia
- Phylum: Arthropoda
- Clade: Pancrustacea
- Class: Insecta
- Order: Coleoptera
- Suborder: Adephaga
- Family: Dytiscidae
- Genus: Hydroporus
- Species: H. striola

Binomial name
- Hydroporus striola (Gyllenhal, 1826)

Synonyms
- Hydroporus striola subtonsus LeConte, 1855

= Hydroporus striola =

Species of beetle

Hydroporus striola is a species of predaceous diving beetle in the family Dytiscidae. It is found in North America and the Palearctic.
