= Hydroporus melsheimeri =

Scientific classification
- Kingdom: Animalia
- Phylum: Arthropoda
- Clade: Pancrustacea
- Class: Insecta
- Order: Coleoptera
- Suborder: Adephaga
- Family: Dytiscidae
- Genus: Hydroporus
- Species: H. melsheimeri

Binomial name
- Hydroporus melsheimeri Fall, 1917

Species of beetle

Hydroporus melsheimeri is a species of predaceous diving beetle in the family Dytiscidae. It is found in North America.
