= Self-sealing suction cup =

The self-sealing suction cup is a suction cup that exerts a suction force only when it is in physical contact with an object. Unlike most other suction cups, it does not exert any suction force when it is not in contact with an object. Its grasping ability is achieved entirely through passive means without the use of sensors, valves, or actuators.

It was designed so that, when used as part of a suction cup array, the suction cups that don't come in contact with the object remain sealed. By having only the suction cups that are in direct contact of the object exhibit suction force, the researchers were able to minimize leak points where air could enter and increase the pressure that each active cup receives, maximizing the suction force. As a result, an array of self-sealing suction cups can grasp and pick up a wide range of object sizes and shapes. This comes in contrast to conventional suction cups that are typically designed for one specific object size and geometry. In addition, suction cups of various sizes have been manufactured, ranging from the palm of a hand to the point of a fingertip.

The self-sealing suction cup was first developed in 2010 by a collaboration of researchers from the U.S. Army Research Laboratory (ARL), the Edgewood Chemical Biological Center at Aberdeen Proving Ground, and the University of Maryland.

== Design ==
The design of the self-sealing suction cup was initially inspired by the suckers of the octopus and its ability to pick up different sized items by individually actuating its suction cups based on the item's size and physical features.

The internal geometry of the self-sealing suction cup was designed to the smallest possible size and features a minimum wall thickness of 1.02 mm, a tube diameter of 1.59 mm, and minimum part spacing of 0.13 mm. The suction cup incorporates a mix of rubber and plastic components, where the cup lip, base, tube, springs, and plug are made out of soft rubber while the cup side, collar, hinges, and flange are made out of plastic. As part of its design, a central vacuum pump can be used to maximize the suction force of the suction cup. A multi-material 3D printer was used to create the prototype of the self-sealing suction cup in about 20 minutes.

Inside the self-sealing suction cup, the plug is positioned close to the tube opening so that it can get sucked into the tube seal the hole when the central suction line is powered. A pair of springs connected to the suction cup's base helps maintain the plug's position, restoring the plug seal in the absence of object forces. If the cup makes contact with an object, a hinge action raises the plug away from the suction tube. The moment the cup's lips are pushed against the object, the passive reaction forces from the cup lips are transferred to the rubber base of the cup, which stretches over the collar and allow the structure to compress. Acting as a pivot for the hinges, the collar causes the hinges to rotate and the edges of the hinges slide along the underside of the flange and raise the plug away from the suction tube opening. As a result, the suction cup self-seals when not in contact with an object and self-opens the cup's lips makes contacts with an object.

In 2015, several improvements were made to the design of the self-sealing suction cup to improve its grasping capabilities. The previous design demonstrated the following flaws:

1. The design required a high overall cup height, which increased the bulk of the device.
2. The design was relatively fragile with respect to hyper-extension as well as torsional and shear forces.
3. The internal geometry made it difficult to remove the support material inside, varying the quality of the seal.

To address these flaws, researchers from ARL decreased the number of components by consolidating the functions of several parts, which reduced the uncompressed height of the suction cup by almost 50% to 0.72 cm. The cup diameter was also reduced to 1.07 cm. A lever system was added to the base of the cup, which pivots the collar to lift the plug. In addition, the tube doubles as a spring, which helps restore the levers and the plug to their closed position. A plastic restraint was added around the cup to aid with handling the hyper-extension, shear, and torsional forces.

== Performance ==
The self-sealing suction cup has been subjected to a series of tests to determine the quality of its performance. A flexible test rig with four dime-sized suction cups and plastic ribs connected with rubber tubes was created for force-displacement and testing.

A force-displacement test that compared the performance between the self-sealing suction cup, an identical suction cup, and a commercially available suction cup found that the internal structures of the self-sealing cup allowed more force to be exerted for the same displacement compared to the other cups. However, under identical conditions, the self-sealing cup achieved a maximum force of 12.5 N while the commercially available cup achieved a maximum force of 12.9 N.

A seal quality test measured the pressure generated from each self-sealing suction cup. The results showed that an array of four cups maintained a pressure of 93.8% atmospheric. The test also demonstrated that not all the cups were equally efficient at sealing after object contact. However, this could be the result of variation in the cups’ prior usage.

During object grasping testing where the grasping range was examined, the test rig successfully grasped about 80% of the objects attempted. These items consisted of the following: TV remote, pill bottle, glue stick, eyeglasses, fork, disposable bottle, toothpaste, coffee mug, bowl, plate, book, cell phone, bar of soap, paper money, mail, keys, show, table knife, medicine box, credit card, coin, pillow, hairbrush, non-disposable bottle, wallet, magazine, soda can, newspaper, scissors, wrist watch, purse, lighter, compact disc, telephone receiver, full wine bottle, full wine glass, light bulb, lock, padded volleyball, wooden block. As a demonstration of the cups’ strength, the ARL researchers were able to pick up a full bottle of wine using only four of the dime-sized suction cups.

== Use in robotics ==
The self-sealing suction cups have been incorporated in robots to improve their passive grasping capabilities. Due to the design of the suction cups, a central vacuum source can be used to effectively generate suction force from the cups and reduce the number of actuators and sensors for the robot.

Researchers from ARL designed and developed a three-finger hand actuator system using a 3D printer in order for the robot to properly utilize the self-sealing suction cups. Four suction cups run along the bottom of each finger, which contains a narrow vacuum channel running through the center. A central vacuum pump serves to power the suction cups and facilitate grasping. The fingers can also curl around the object to better grasp it and release any object in its hold by feeding back the output of the vacuum pump and emitting a burst of positive pressure.

The three-finger hand has been used by aerial systems and has demonstrated considerable success in grasping objects on the ground while maintaining flight. According to ARL researchers, the self-sealing suction cups may exhibit higher rates of success underwater due to the extra pressure from the sea depths surrounding and pressing against the object and grasper. However, they noted that an underwater environment would require different manufacturing materials that would allow the suction cups to perform well in salt water, such as a thermal plastic.
