= Stictotarsus decemsignatus =

Scientific classification
- Domain: Eukaryota
- Kingdom: Animalia
- Phylum: Arthropoda
- Class: Insecta
- Order: Coleoptera
- Suborder: Adephaga
- Family: Dytiscidae
- Genus: Stictotarsus
- Species: S. decemsignatus

Binomial name
- Stictotarsus decemsignatus (Clark, 1862)

Synonyms
- Hydroporus decemsignatus Clark, 1862; Hydroporus mexicanus Sharp, 1882

Species of beetle

Stictotarsus decemsignatus is a species of predaceous diving beetle in the family Dytiscidae. It is found in North America and the Neotropics.
