= Hydrocolus paugus =

Scientific classification
- Domain: Eukaryota
- Kingdom: Animalia
- Phylum: Arthropoda
- Class: Insecta
- Order: Coleoptera
- Suborder: Adephaga
- Family: Dytiscidae
- Genus: Hydrocolus
- Species: H. paugus

Binomial name
- Hydrocolus paugus (Fall, 1923)

Synonyms
- Hydroporus paugus Fall, 1923

Species of beetle

Hydrocolus paugus is a species of predaceous diving beetle in the family Dytiscidae. It belongs to the order of coleoptera. It is found in North America.
