= Hydroporus puberulus =

Scientific classification
- Kingdom: Animalia
- Phylum: Arthropoda
- Clade: Pancrustacea
- Class: Insecta
- Order: Coleoptera
- Suborder: Adephaga
- Family: Dytiscidae
- Genus: Hydroporus
- Species: H. puberulus

Binomial name
- Hydroporus puberulus LeConte, 1850

Species of beetle

Hydroporus puberulus is a species of predaceous diving beetle in the family Dytiscidae. It is found in North America and the Palearctic.
