= Nebrioporus macronychus =

Scientific classification
- Domain: Eukaryota
- Kingdom: Animalia
- Phylum: Arthropoda
- Class: Insecta
- Order: Coleoptera
- Suborder: Adephaga
- Family: Dytiscidae
- Genus: Nebrioporus
- Species: N. macronychus

Binomial name
- Nebrioporus macronychus (Shirt & Angus, 1992)

Species of beetle

Nebrioporus macronychus is a species of predaceous diving beetle in the family Dytiscidae. It is found in North America.
