= Hydroporus morio =

Scientific classification
- Kingdom: Animalia
- Phylum: Arthropoda
- Clade: Pancrustacea
- Class: Insecta
- Order: Coleoptera
- Suborder: Adephaga
- Family: Dytiscidae
- Genus: Hydroporus
- Species: H. morio

Binomial name
- Hydroporus morio Aubé, 1838

Species of beetle

Hydroporus morio is a species of predaceous diving beetle in the family Dytiscidae. It is found in Europe and Northern Asia (excluding China) and North America.
