= Hydroporus subpubescens =

Scientific classification
- Kingdom: Animalia
- Phylum: Arthropoda
- Clade: Pancrustacea
- Class: Insecta
- Order: Coleoptera
- Suborder: Adephaga
- Family: Dytiscidae
- Genus: Hydroporus
- Species: H. subpubescens

Binomial name
- Hydroporus subpubescens LeConte, 1852

Species of beetle

Hydroporus subpubescens is a species in the family Dytiscidae ("predaceous diving beetles"), in the order Coleoptera ("beetles"). It is found in North America.
