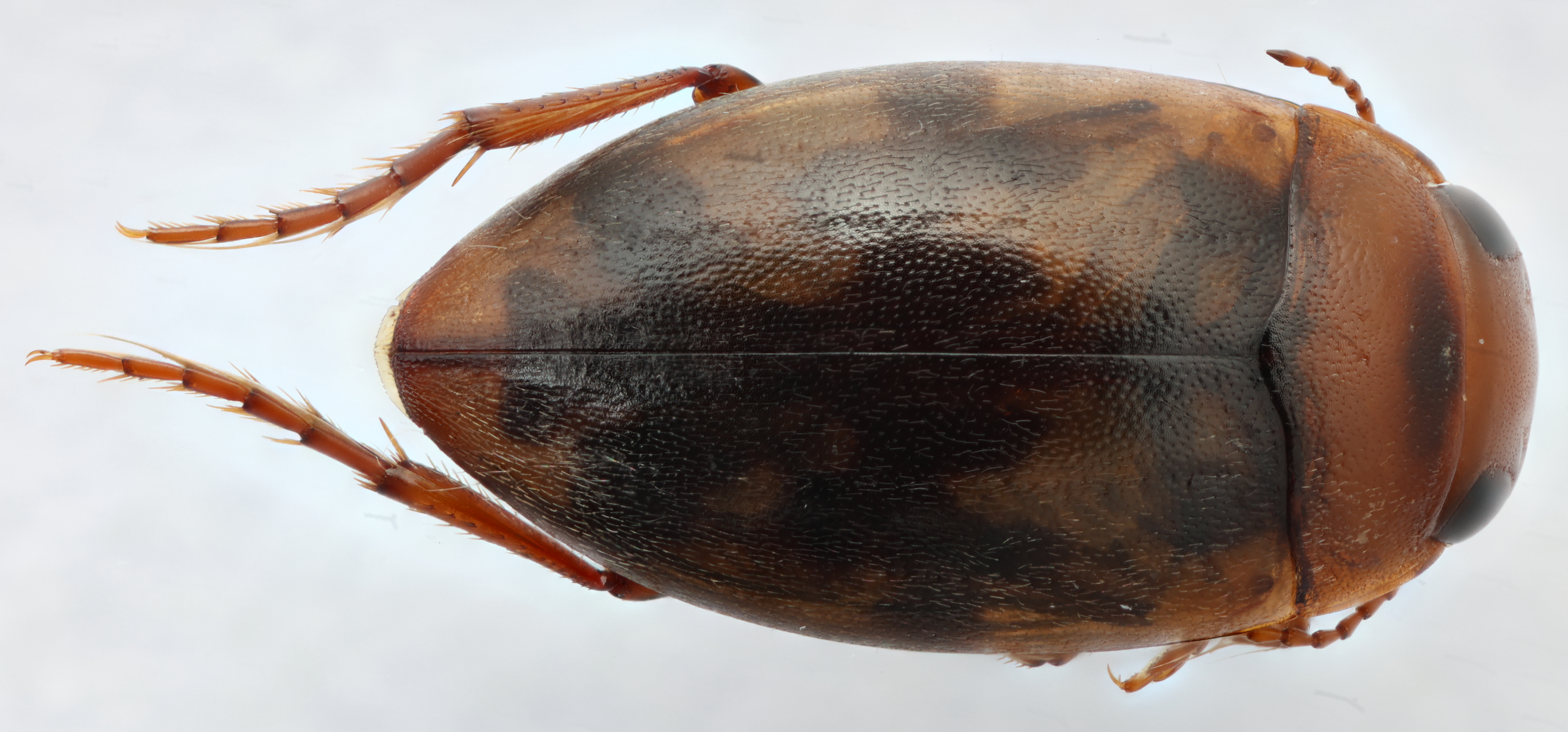

Scientific classification
- Kingdom: Animalia
- Phylum: Arthropoda
- Clade: Pancrustacea
- Class: Insecta
- Order: Coleoptera
- Suborder: Adephaga
- Family: Dytiscidae
- Genus: Heterosternuta
- Species: H. diversicornis

Binomial name
- Heterosternuta diversicornis (Sharp, 1882)

Synonyms
- Hydroporus diversicornis Sharp, 1882

= Heterosternuta diversicornis =

Species of beetle

Heterosternuta diversicornis is a species of predaceous diving beetle in the family Dytiscidae. It is found in North America.
