= Stictotarsus corvinus =

Scientific classification
- Kingdom: Animalia
- Phylum: Arthropoda
- Class: Insecta
- Order: Coleoptera
- Suborder: Adephaga
- Family: Dytiscidae
- Genus: Stictotarsus
- Species: S. corvinus

Binomial name
- Stictotarsus corvinus (Sharp, 1887)

Synonyms
- Hydroporus corvinus Sharp, 1887

Species of beetle

Stictotarsus corvinus is a species of predaceous diving beetle in the family Dytiscidae. It is found in North America and the Neotropics.
