= Hydroporus notabilis =

Scientific classification
- Kingdom: Animalia
- Phylum: Arthropoda
- Clade: Pancrustacea
- Class: Insecta
- Order: Coleoptera
- Suborder: Adephaga
- Family: Dytiscidae
- Genus: Hydroporus
- Species: H. notabilis

Binomial name
- Hydroporus notabilis Leconte, 1850

Synonyms
- Hydroporus arcticus Thomson, 1856

Species of beetle

Hydroporus notabilis is a species of predaceous diving beetle in the family Dytiscidae. It is found in North America and the Palearctic.

== Subspecies ==
These two subspecies belong to the species Hydroporus notabilis:

- Hydroporus notabilis arcticus Thomson, 1856
- Hydroporus notabilis notabilis
