= Hydroporus compunctus =

Conservation status
- Critically Endangered (IUCN 2.3)

Scientific classification
- Kingdom: Animalia
- Phylum: Arthropoda
- Clade: Pancrustacea
- Class: Insecta
- Order: Coleoptera
- Suborder: Adephaga
- Family: Dytiscidae
- Genus: Hydroporus
- Species: H. compunctus

Binomial name
- Hydroporus compunctus Wollaston, 1865

Synonyms
- Hydrotarsus compunctus (Wollaston, 1865)

Species of beetle

Hydroporus compunctus is a species of predaceous diving beetle in the family Dytiscidae. It is endemic to the Canary Islands.

IUCN lists this species as "critically endangered" under its previous genus, Hydrotarsus.
