= Hydrocolus persimilis =

Scientific classification
- Domain: Eukaryota
- Kingdom: Animalia
- Phylum: Arthropoda
- Class: Insecta
- Order: Coleoptera
- Suborder: Adephaga
- Family: Dytiscidae
- Genus: Hydrocolus
- Species: H. persimilis

Binomial name
- Hydrocolus persimilis (Crotch, 1873)

Synonyms
- Hydroporus acadianus J. Balfour-Browne, 1948; Hydroporus aequus Fall, 1923

Species of beetle

Hydrocolus persimilis is a species of predaceous diving beetle in the family Dytiscidae. It is found in North America.
