= Heterosternuta wickhami =

Scientific classification
- Domain: Eukaryota
- Kingdom: Animalia
- Phylum: Arthropoda
- Class: Insecta
- Order: Coleoptera
- Suborder: Adephaga
- Family: Dytiscidae
- Genus: Heterosternuta
- Species: H. wickhami

Binomial name
- Heterosternuta wickhami (Zaitzev, 1908)

Synonyms
- Hydroporus wickhami Zaitzev, 1908

Species of beetle

Heterosternuta wickhami, the hydroporus diving beetle, is a species of predaceous diving beetle in the family Dytiscidae. It is found in North America.
