= Hydroporus gossei =

Scientific classification
- Kingdom: Animalia
- Phylum: Arthropoda
- Clade: Pancrustacea
- Class: Insecta
- Order: Coleoptera
- Suborder: Adephaga
- Family: Dytiscidae
- Genus: Hydroporus
- Species: H. gossei

Binomial name
- Hydroporus gossei Larson & Roughley in Larson, Alarie & Roughley, 2000

Species of beetle

Hydroporus gossei is a species of predaceous diving beetle in the family Dytiscidae. It is found in North America.
