= Stictotarsus deceptus =

Scientific classification
- Domain: Eukaryota
- Kingdom: Animalia
- Phylum: Arthropoda
- Class: Insecta
- Order: Coleoptera
- Suborder: Adephaga
- Family: Dytiscidae
- Genus: Stictotarsus
- Species: S. deceptus

Binomial name
- Stictotarsus deceptus (Fall, 1932)

Synonyms
- Hydroporus deceptus Fall, 1932

Species of beetle

Stictotarsus deceptus is a species of predaceous diving beetle in the family Dytiscidae. It is found in North America.
