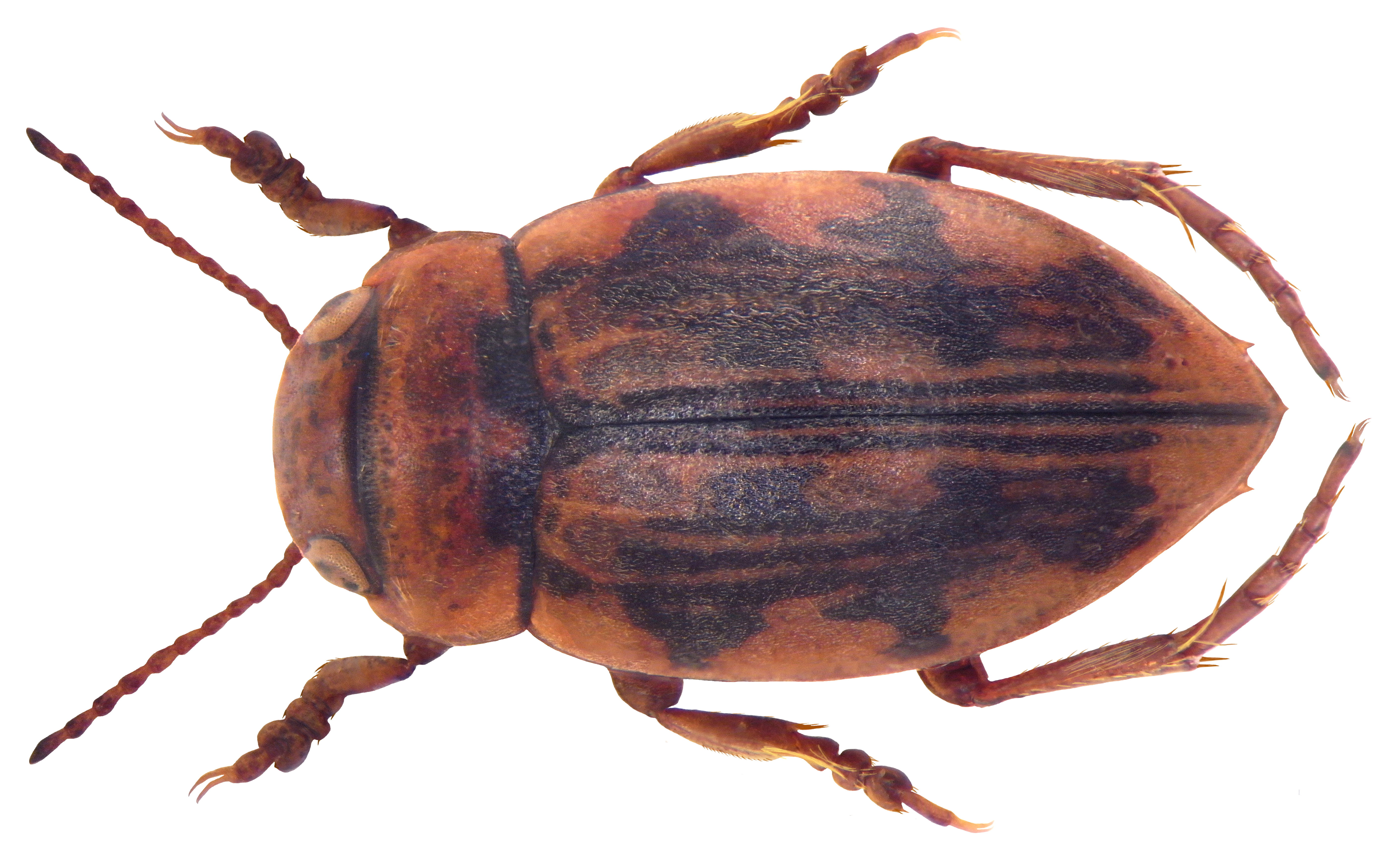

Scientific classification
- Kingdom: Animalia
- Phylum: Arthropoda
- Clade: Pancrustacea
- Class: Insecta
- Order: Coleoptera
- Suborder: Adephaga
- Family: Dytiscidae
- Genus: Nebrioporus
- Species: N. elegans

Binomial name
- Nebrioporus elegans (Panzer, 1794)

Synonyms
- Deronectes elegans; Dytiscus elegans Panzer, 1794; Potamonectes elegans (Panzer, 1794)

= Nebrioporus elegans =

Species of beetle

Nebrioporus elegans is a species of beetles in the family Dytiscidae. It is found in Europe.
