= Hydroporus signatus =

Scientific classification
- Kingdom: Animalia
- Phylum: Arthropoda
- Clade: Pancrustacea
- Class: Insecta
- Order: Coleoptera
- Suborder: Adephaga
- Family: Dytiscidae
- Genus: Hydroporus
- Species: H. signatus

Binomial name
- Hydroporus signatus Mannerheim, 1853

Species of beetle

Hydroporus signatus is a species of predaceous diving beetle in the family Dytiscidae. It is found in North America.

== Subspecies ==
These two subspecies belong to the species Hydroporus signatus:

- Hydroporus signatus signatus Mannerheim, 1853
- Hydroporus signatus youngi Gordon, 1981
