= Suction cup =

Device used to adhere to nonporous surfaces

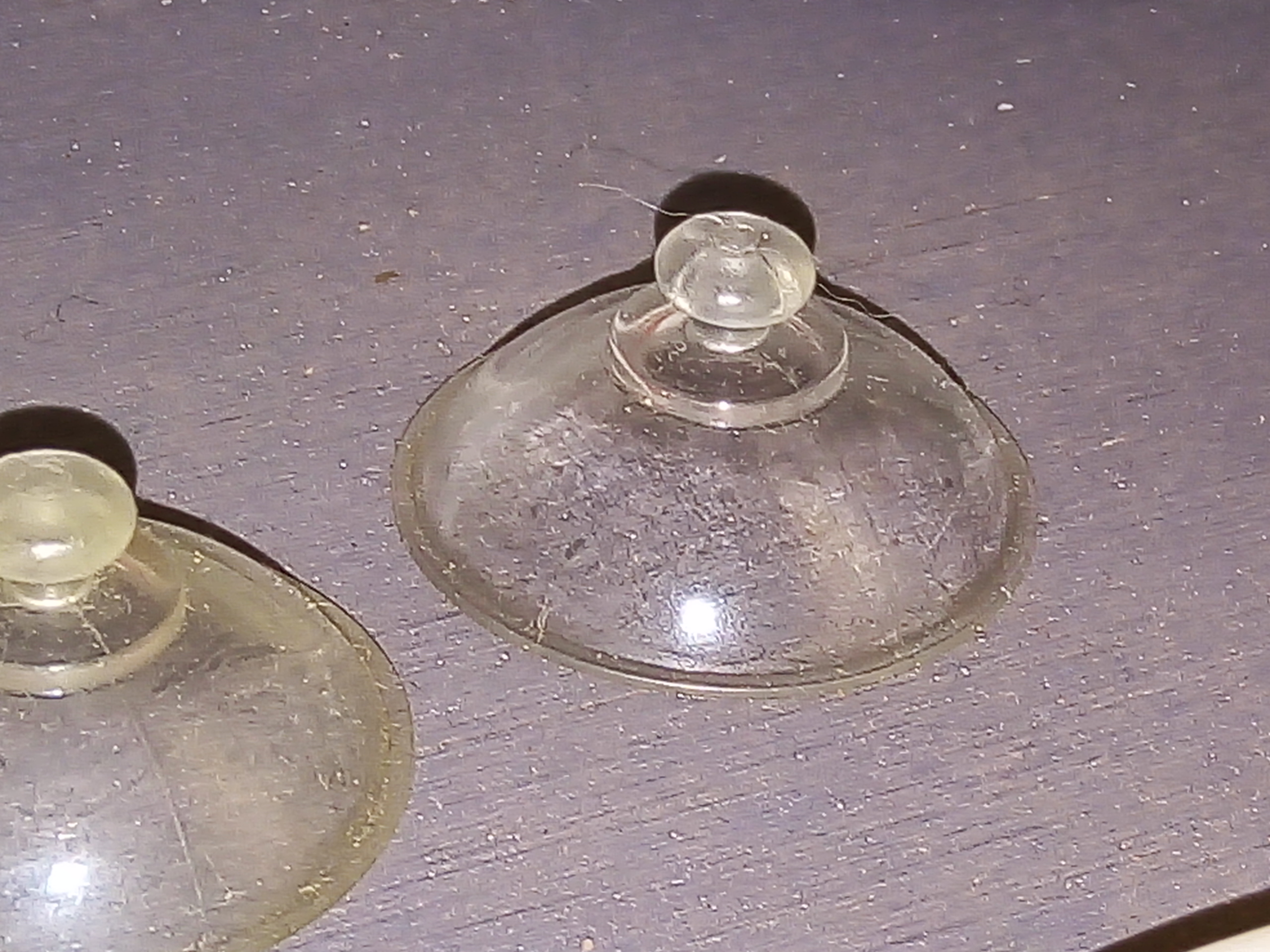
A transparent suction cup

The pressure on a suction cup, as exerted by collisions of gas molecules, holds the suction cup in contact with the surface.

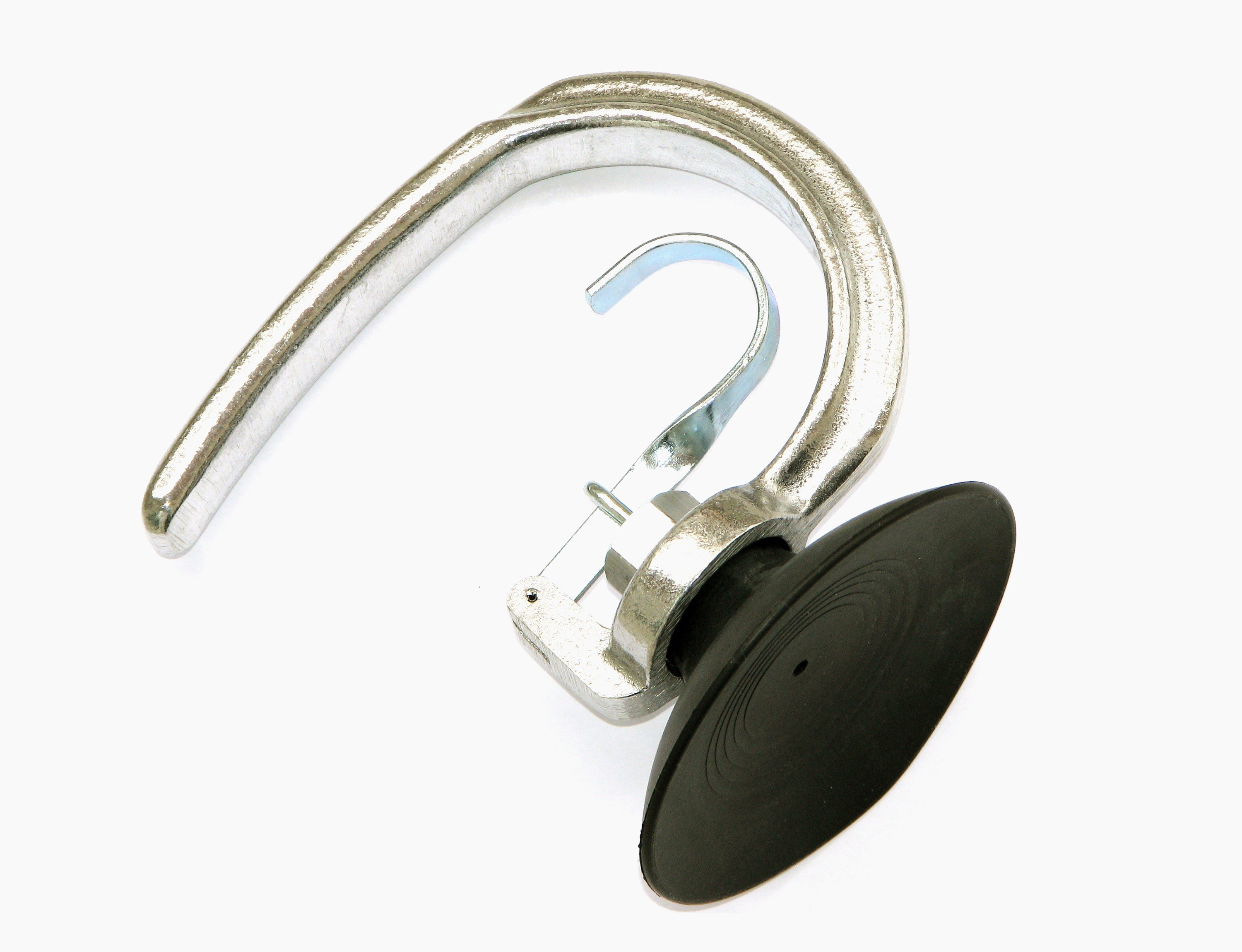
One cup suction lifter.

A suction cup, also known as a sucker, is a device or object that uses the negative fluid pressure of air or water to adhere to nonporous surfaces, creating a partial vacuum.

Suction cups occur in nature on the bodies of some animals such as octopuses and squid, and have been reproduced artificially for numerous purposes.

== Theory ==
The working face of the suction cup is made of elastic, flexible material and has a curved surface. When the center of the suction cup is pressed against a flat, non-porous surface, the volume of the space between the suction cup and the flat surface is reduced, which causes the air or water between the cup and the surface to be expelled past the rim of the circular cup. The cavity which develops between the cup and the flat surface has little to no air or water in it because most of the fluid has already been forced out of the inside of the cup, causing a lack of pressure. The pressure difference between the atmosphere on the outside of the cup and the low-pressure cavity on the inside of the cup keeps the cup adhered to the surface.

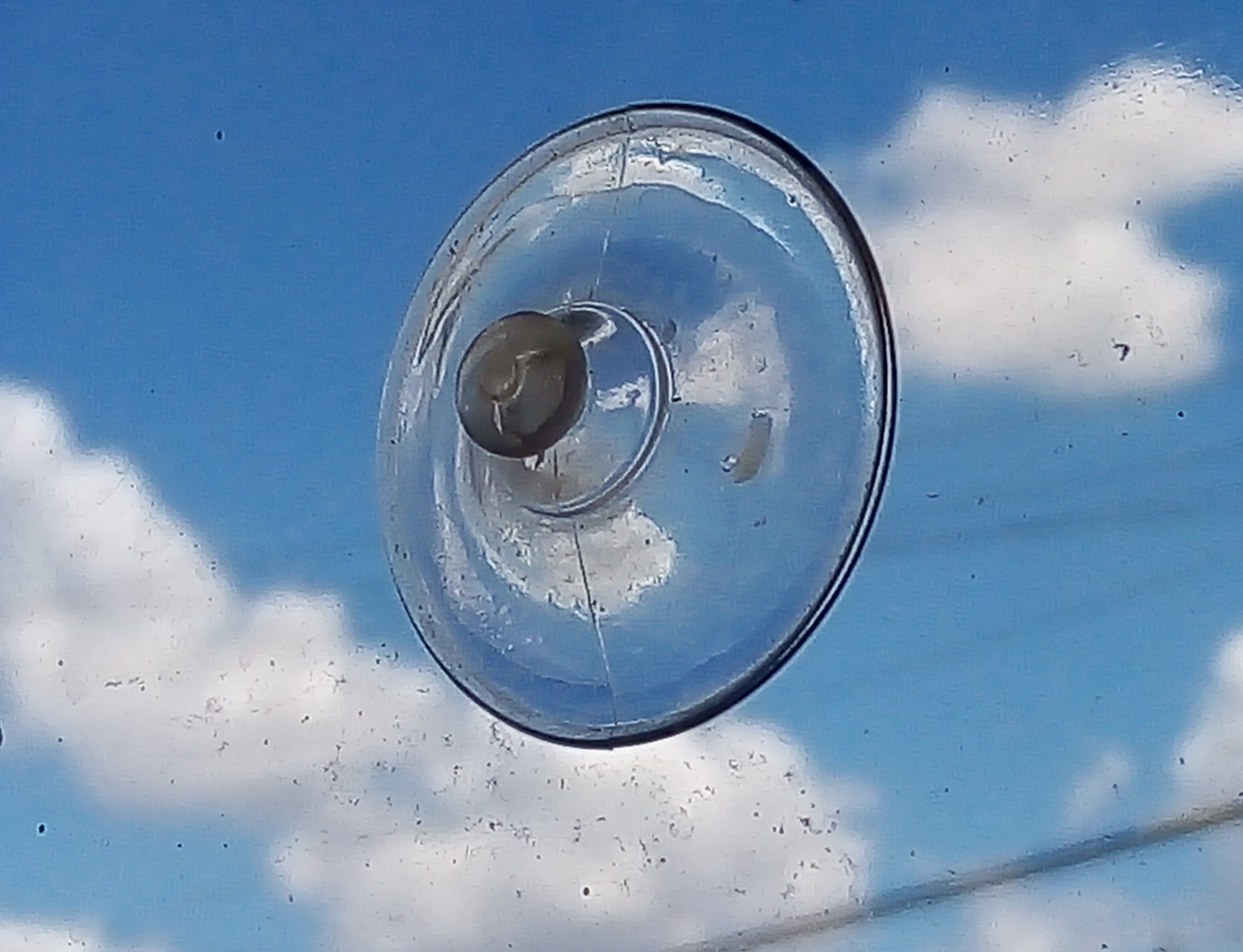
Suction cup pressed on a window

When the user ceases to apply physical pressure to the outside of the cup, the elastic substance of which the cup is made tends to resume its original, curved shape. The length of time for which the suction effect can be maintained depends mainly on how long it takes for air or water to leak back into the cavity between the cup and the surface, equalizing the pressure with the surrounding atmosphere. This depends on the porosity and flatness of the surface and the properties of the cup's rim. A small amount of mineral oil or vegetable oil is often employed to help maintain the seal.

== Calculations ==
The force required to detach an ideal suction cup by pulling it directly away from the surface is given by the formula:

$$F = AP$$

where:

F is the force,
A is the area of the surface covered by the cup,
P is the pressure outside the cup (typically atmospheric pressure)

This is derived from the definition of pressure, which is:

$$P = F/A$$

For example, a suction cup of radius 2.0 cm has an area of $\pi$(0.020 m)^{2} = 0.0013 square meters. Using the force formula (F = AP), the result is F = (0.0013 m^{2})(100,000 Pa) = about 130 newtons.

The above formula relies on several assumptions:

1. The outer diameter of the cup does not change when the cup is pulled.
2. No air leaks into the gap between the cup and the surface.
3. The pulling force is applied perpendicular to the surface so that the cup does not slide sideways or peel off.
4. The suction cup contains a perfect vacuum; in reality, a small partial pressure will remain on the interior, and P is the differential pressure.

== Artificial use ==
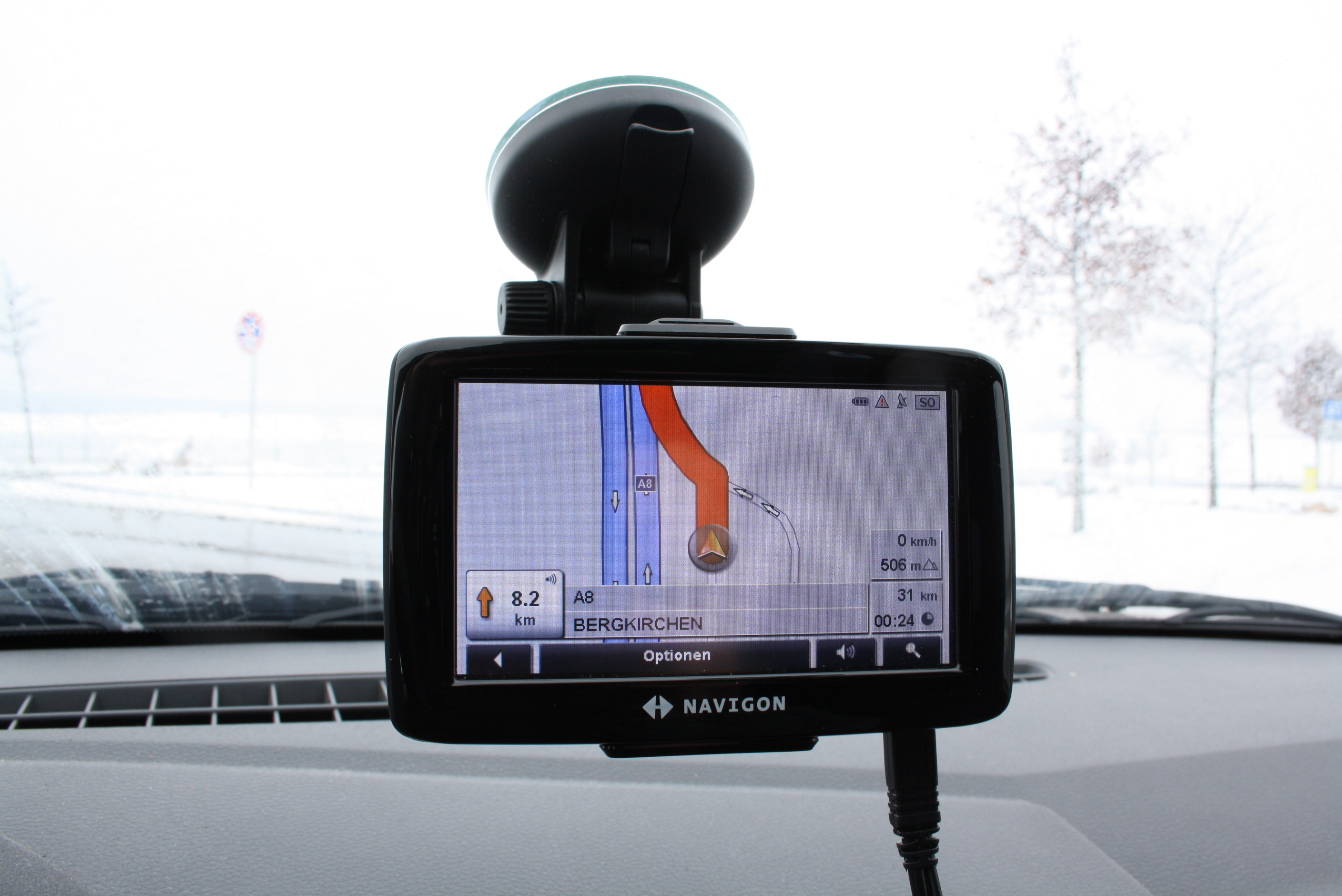
SatNav devices often ship with suction cup holders for mounting on windscreens.

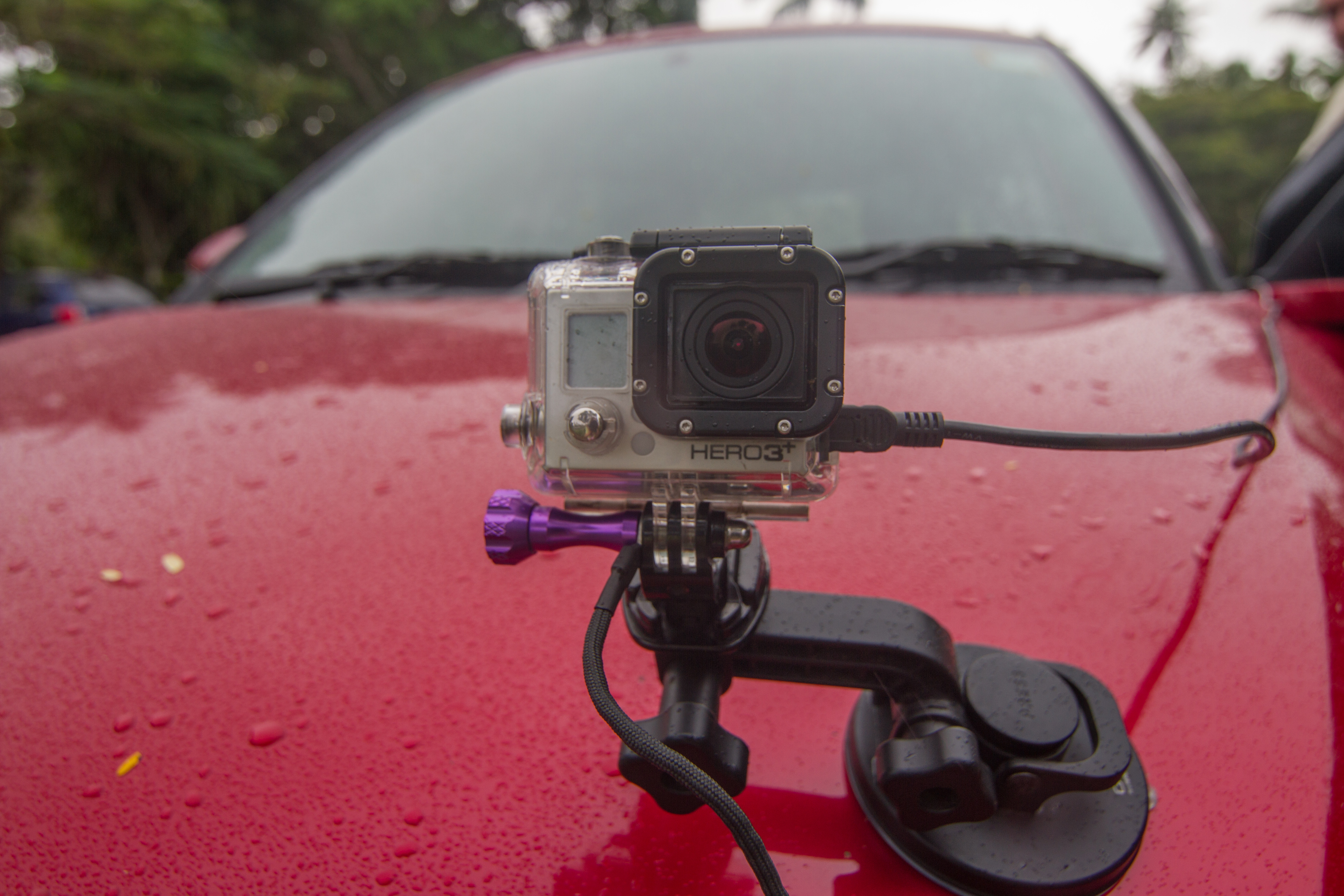
GoPro camera attached to car with suction cup

Artificial suction cups are believed to have first been used in the third century, B.C., and were made out of gourds. They were used to suction "bad blood" from internal organs to the surface. Hippocrates is believed to have invented this procedure.

The first modern suction cup patents were issued by the United States Patent and Trademark Office during the 1860s. TC Roche was awarded U.S. Patent No. 52,748 in 1866 for a "Photographic Developer Dipping Stick"; the patent discloses a primitive suction cup means for handling photographic plates during developing procedures. In 1868, Orwell Needham patented a more refined suction cup design, U.S. Patent No. 82,629, calling his invention an "Atmospheric Knob" purposed for general use as a handle and drawer opening means.

Suction cups have a number of commercial and industrial applications:

- To attach an object to a flat, nonporous surface, such as a refrigerator door or a tile on a wall. This is also used for mooring ships.
- To move an object, such as a pane of glass or a raised floor tile, by attaching the suction cup to a flat, nonporous part of the object and then sliding or lifting the object.
- In some toys, such as Nerf darts.
- As toilet plungers.
- To climb up almost or completely vertically up or down a flat, nonporous surface, such as the sides of some buildings. This is part of buildering, which is also known as urban climbing.
- To hold an object still while it is worked on, such as holding a piece of glass while performing edge grinding.

On May 25, 1981, Dan Goodwin, a.k.a. SpiderDan, scaled Sears Tower, the former world's tallest building, with a pair of suction cups. He went on to scale the Renaissance Center in Dallas, the Bonaventure Hotel in Los Angeles, the World Trade Center in New York City, Parque Central Tower in Caracas, the Nippon TV station in Tokyo, and the Millennium Tower in San Francisco.

== See also ==
- Airlock
- Horror vacui (physics)
- Magdeburg hemispheres
- Self-sealing suction cup
