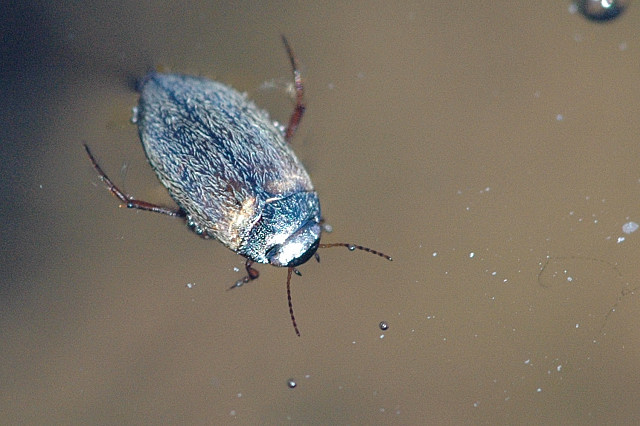
- Hydroporus pubescens

Scientific classification
- Kingdom: Animalia
- Phylum: Arthropoda
- Class: Insecta
- Order: Coleoptera
- Suborder: Adephaga
- Family: Dytiscidae
- Subfamily: Hydroporinae
- Tribe: Hydroporini; Aubé, 1836

Synonyms
- Carabhydrini Watts, 1978

= Hydroporini =

Tribe of beetles

Hydroporini is a tribe of predaceous diving beetles in the family Dytiscidae. There are at least 730 described species in Hydroporini.
