= Prasophyllum album =

Scientific classification
- Kingdom: Plantae
- Clade: Tracheophytes
- Clade: Angiosperms
- Clade: Monocots
- Order: Asparagales
- Family: Orchidaceae
- Subfamily: Orchidoideae
- Tribe: Diurideae
- Subtribe: Prasophyllinae
- Genus: Prasophyllum
- Species: P. album

Binomial name
- Prasophyllum album R.S.Rogers

Synonyms
- Prasophyllum odoratum var. album (R.S.Rogers) R.S.Rogers; Prasophyllum odoratum R.S.Rogers; Prasophyllum patens R.Br.

Species of orchid

Prasophyllum album is a species of orchid endemic to Australia. It was first described in 1909 by Richard Rogers from specimens collected in South Australia but is of uncertain application. The herbarium of the Royal Botanic Gardens Victoria notes "The relationship between P. odoratum sens. strict. and P. patens, P. robustum, P. truncatum and P. album is (also) in need of study."
