= Granastyochus trifasciatus =

Scientific classification
- Kingdom: Animalia
- Phylum: Arthropoda
- Class: Insecta
- Order: Coleoptera
- Suborder: Polyphaga
- Infraorder: Cucujiformia
- Family: Cerambycidae
- Genus: Granastyochus
- Species: G. trifasciatus

Binomial name
- Granastyochus trifasciatus Gilmour, 1959

Species of beetle

Granastyochus trifasciatus is a species of longhorn beetles of the subfamily Lamiinae. It was described by Gilmour in 1959, and is known from Venezuela and eastern Ecuador.
