= Granastyochus nigropunctatus =

Scientific classification
- Kingdom: Animalia
- Phylum: Arthropoda
- Class: Insecta
- Order: Coleoptera
- Suborder: Polyphaga
- Infraorder: Cucujiformia
- Family: Cerambycidae
- Genus: Granastyochus
- Species: G. nigropunctatus

Binomial name
- Granastyochus nigropunctatus (Bates, 1881)

Species of beetle

Granastyochus nigropunctatus is a species of longhorn beetles of the subfamily Lamiinae. It was described by Bates in 1881, and is known from eastern Mexico, Guatemala, and Honduras.
