= Granastyochus picticauda =

Scientific classification
- Kingdom: Animalia
- Phylum: Arthropoda
- Class: Insecta
- Order: Coleoptera
- Suborder: Polyphaga
- Infraorder: Cucujiformia
- Family: Cerambycidae
- Genus: Granastyochus
- Species: G. picticauda

Binomial name
- Granastyochus picticauda (Bates, 1881)

Species of beetle

Granastyochus picticauda is a species of longhorn beetle of the subfamily Lamiinae. It was described by Henry Walter Bates in 1881, and is known from Guatemala and Panama.
