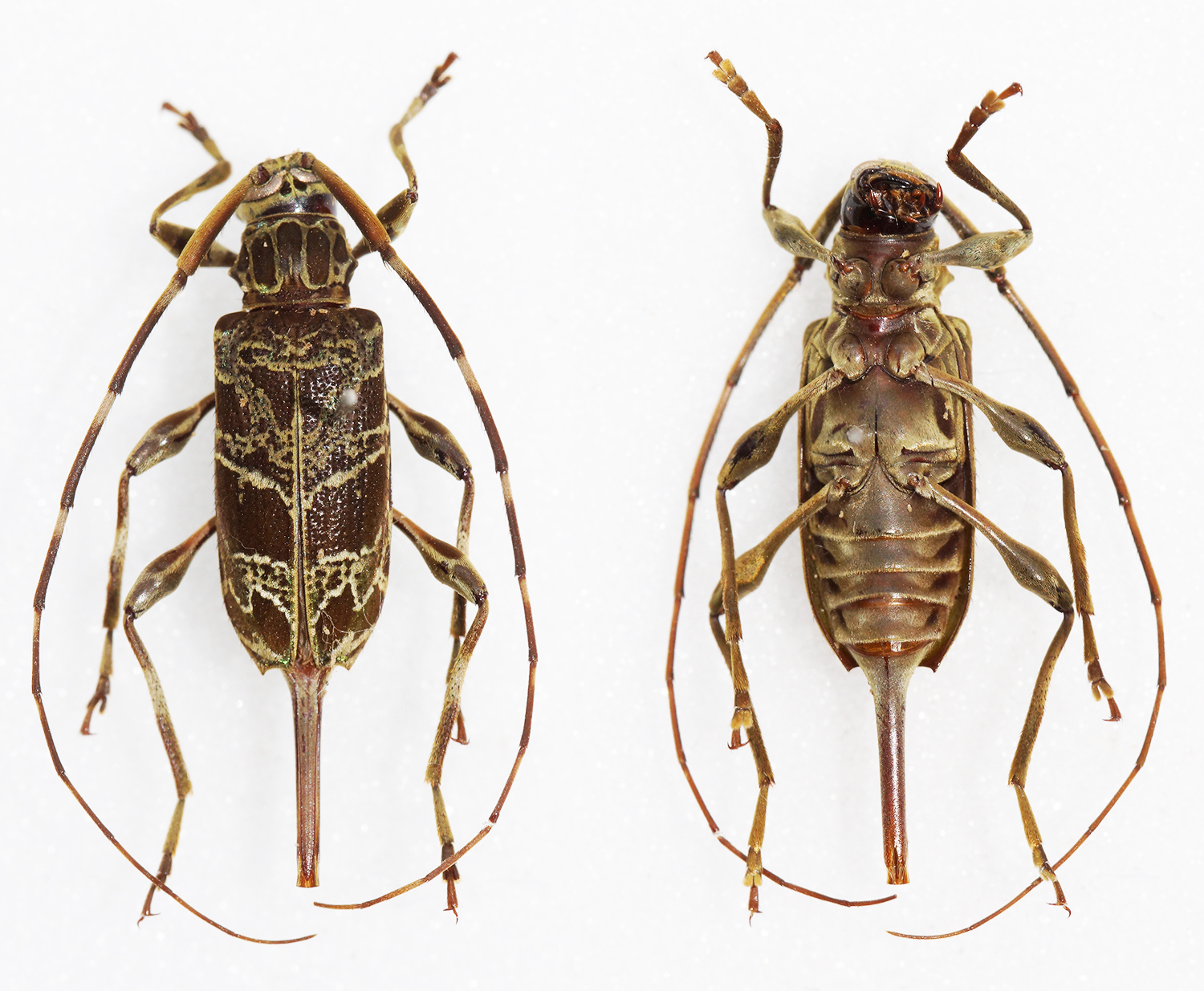
- Granastyochus elegantissimus

Scientific classification
- Kingdom: Animalia
- Phylum: Arthropoda
- Class: Insecta
- Order: Coleoptera
- Suborder: Polyphaga
- Infraorder: Cucujiformia
- Family: Cerambycidae
- Tribe: Acanthocinini
- Genus: Granastyochus

= Granastyochus =

Genus of beetles

Granastyochus is a genus of beetles in the family Cerambycidae, containing the following species:

- Granastyochus elegantissimus (Tippmann, 1953)
- Granastyochus fulgidus Monné & Martins, 1976
- Granastyochus intricatus Monné & Martins, 1976
- Granastyochus nigropunctatus (Bates, 1881)
- Granastyochus picticauda (Bates, 1881)
- Granastyochus trifasciatus Gilmour, 1959
