= Granastyochus intricatus =

Scientific classification
- Kingdom: Animalia
- Phylum: Arthropoda
- Class: Insecta
- Order: Coleoptera
- Suborder: Polyphaga
- Infraorder: Cucujiformia
- Family: Cerambycidae
- Genus: Granastyochus
- Species: G. intricatus

Binomial name
- Granastyochus intricatus Monné & Martins, 1976

Species of beetle

Granastyochus intricatus is a species of longhorn beetles of the subfamily Lamiinae. It was described by Monné and Martins in 1976, and is known from Peru.
