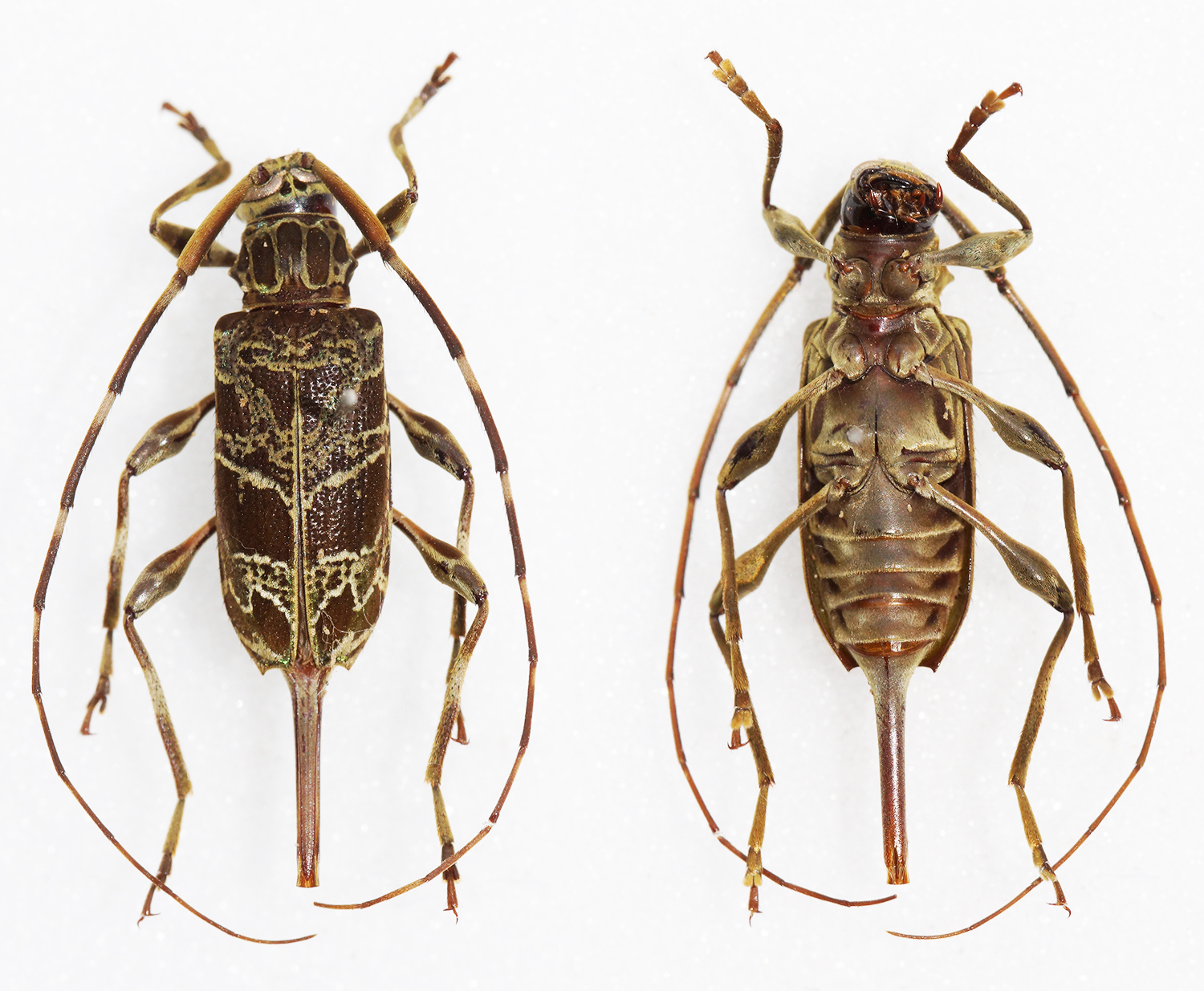

Scientific classification
- Kingdom: Animalia
- Phylum: Arthropoda
- Class: Insecta
- Order: Coleoptera
- Suborder: Polyphaga
- Infraorder: Cucujiformia
- Family: Cerambycidae
- Genus: Granastyochus
- Species: G. elegantissimus

Binomial name
- Granastyochus elegantissimus (Tippmann, 1953)

= Granastyochus elegantissimus =

Species of beetle

Granastyochus elegantissimus is a species of longhorn beetles of the subfamily Lamiinae. It was described by Tippmann in 1953, and is known Costa Rica, Colombia, eastern Ecuador, Peru, Bolivia, and French Guiana.
