= Etaxalus =

Scientific classification
- Domain: Eukaryota
- Kingdom: Animalia
- Phylum: Arthropoda
- Class: Insecta
- Order: Coleoptera
- Suborder: Polyphaga
- Infraorder: Cucujiformia
- Family: Cerambycidae
- Tribe: Pteropliini
- Genus: Etaxalus

Genus of beetles

Etaxalus is a genus of longhorn beetles of the subfamily Lamiinae, containing the following species:

- Etaxalus granulipennis Breuning, 1953
- Etaxalus iliacus Pascoe, 1865
- Etaxalus laterialbus Breuning, 1968
- Etaxalus marmoratus Breuning, 1950
- Etaxalus rotundipennis Breuning, 1976
