= Etaxalus granulipennis =

Scientific classification
- Kingdom: Animalia
- Phylum: Arthropoda
- Class: Insecta
- Order: Coleoptera
- Suborder: Polyphaga
- Infraorder: Cucujiformia
- Family: Cerambycidae
- Genus: Etaxalus
- Species: E. granulipennis

Binomial name
- Etaxalus granulipennis Breuning, 1953

Species of beetle

Etaxalus granulipennis is a species of beetle in the family Cerambycidae. It was described by Stephan von Breuning in 1953.
