= Etaxalus iliacus =

Scientific classification
- Kingdom: Animalia
- Phylum: Arthropoda
- Clade: Pancrustacea
- Class: Insecta
- Order: Coleoptera
- Suborder: Polyphaga
- Infraorder: Cucujiformia
- Family: Cerambycidae
- Genus: Etaxalus
- Species: E. iliacus

Binomial name
- Etaxalus iliacus Pascoe, 1865

Species of beetle

Etaxalus iliacus is a species of beetle in the family Cerambycidae. It was described by Francis Polkinghorne Pascoe in 1865. It is known from Java, Malaysia and Borneo.
