= Asphondylia antennariae =

Scientific classification
- Kingdom: Animalia
- Phylum: Arthropoda
- Class: Insecta
- Order: Diptera
- Family: Cecidomyiidae
- Supertribe: Asphondyliidi
- Tribe: Asphondyliini
- Genus: Asphondylia
- Species: A. antennariae

Binomial name
- Asphondylia antennariae (Wheeler, 1889)

Synonyms
- Asynapta antennariae Wheeler, 1889

Species of fly

Asphondylia antennariae is a species of gall midge in the family Cecidomyiidae. The larvae of this species induce galls on the buds of Antennaria plantaginifolia. This species is known from Wisconsin and Maine in the United States, though its host plant is widespread in eastern North America. It was first described by American entomologist William Morton Wheeler in 1889.
