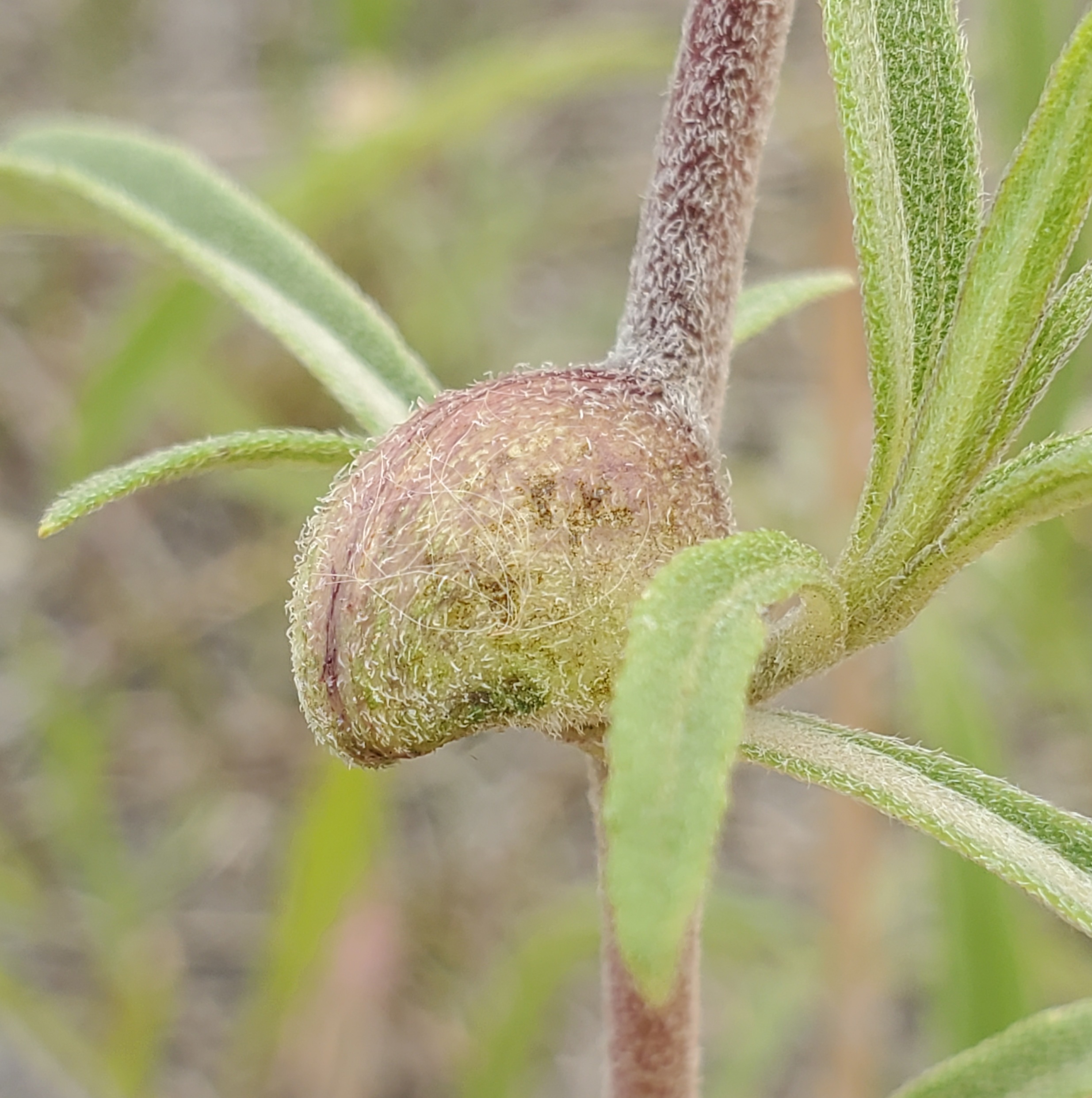
- Asphondylia helianthiglobulus gall on sunflower

Scientific classification
- Kingdom: Animalia
- Phylum: Arthropoda
- Class: Insecta
- Order: Diptera
- Family: Cecidomyiidae
- Supertribe: Asphondyliidi
- Tribe: Asphondyliini
- Genus: Asphondylia
- Species: A. helianthiglobulus

Binomial name
- Asphondylia helianthiglobulus Osten Sacken, 1878

= Asphondylia helianthiglobulus =

Species of fly

Asphondylia helianthiglobulus is a species of gall midge in the family Cecidomyiidae. The larvae of this species induce galls on the stems of several sunflower species in eastern North America, including Helianthus giganteus, H. grosseserratus, and H. maximiliani.
