= Late goldenrod =

Late goldenrod is a common name for several plants and may refer to:

- Solidago altissima
- Solidago gigantea
