= Asphondylia lacinariae =

Scientific classification
- Kingdom: Animalia
- Phylum: Arthropoda
- Class: Insecta
- Order: Diptera
- Family: Cecidomyiidae
- Supertribe: Asphondyliidi
- Tribe: Asphondyliini
- Genus: Asphondylia
- Species: A. lacinariae

Binomial name
- Asphondylia lacinariae Felt, 1935

Species of fly

Asphondylia lacinariae is a species of gall midges in the family Cecidomyiidae.
