= Asphondylia artemisiae =

Scientific classification
- Kingdom: Animalia
- Phylum: Arthropoda
- Class: Insecta
- Order: Diptera
- Family: Cecidomyiidae
- Supertribe: Asphondyliidi
- Tribe: Asphondyliini
- Genus: Asphondylia
- Species: A. artemisiae

Binomial name
- Asphondylia artemisiae Felt, 1908

Species of fly

Asphondylia artemisiae is a species of gall midge in the family Cecidomyiidae. The larvae of this species induce galls on at least one species of sagebrush Artemisia (plant). This species is only known from Arizona in the United States. It was first described by American entomologist Ephraim Porter Felt in 1908.
