= Asphondylia amaranthi =

Scientific classification
- Kingdom: Animalia
- Phylum: Arthropoda
- Class: Insecta
- Order: Diptera
- Family: Cecidomyiidae
- Supertribe: Asphondyliidi
- Tribe: Asphondyliini
- Genus: Asphondylia
- Species: A. amaranthi

Binomial name
- Asphondylia amaranthi Felt, 1935

Species of fly

Asphondylia amaranthi is a species of gall midge in the family Cecidomyiidae.

The larvae of this species induce galls on the fruit of Amaranthus blitoides. Though its host plant is widespread in North America this gall midge species has only been reported from Texas and Florida in the United States and Tamaulipas in Mexico.

It was first described by American entomologist Ephraim Porter Felt in 1935.
