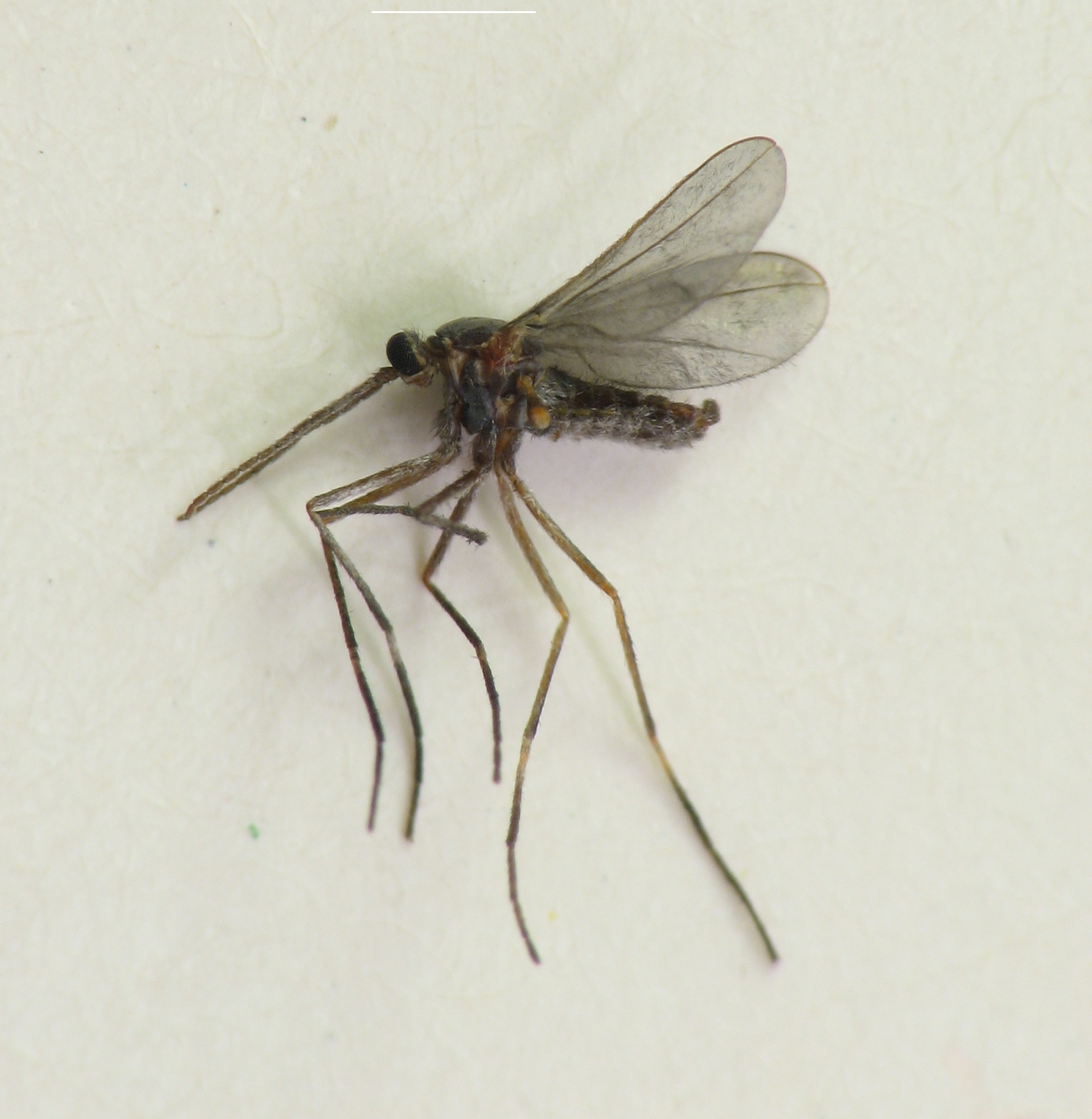

Scientific classification
- Kingdom: Animalia
- Phylum: Arthropoda
- Class: Insecta
- Order: Diptera
- Family: Cecidomyiidae
- Genus: Asphondylia
- Species: A. solidaginis

Binomial name
- Asphondylia solidaginis Beutenmüller, 1907

Synonyms
- Cecidomyia bifolia Stebbins, 1910

= Asphondylia solidaginis =

Species of fly

Asphondylia solidaginis is a species of gall midge (Cecidomyiidae) that induces galls on goldenrods in North America where it is widespread. It was first described by William Beutenmuller in 1907.

This species is multivolitine, having several generations each year. Females in spring and early summer deposit eggs in the leaf buds of Solidago altissima and sometimes Solidago gigantea, leading to the development of galls on the leaves in which the fly larvae live and feed. These single-chambered galls appear as blisters on the leaves and typically join two (sometimes up to four) leaves together in a 'snap' gall, with one leaf forming the bottom of the gall and another leaf forming the top. Adults emerge from the galls in June and July.

Later in the summer leafy rosette galls are formed from buds of Solidago altissima; this species is not known to induce such late-season galls on Solidago gigantea. These rosette galls are 3-5 centimeters in diameter with a single chamber at the center in which the larvae live.

Similar 'snap' and rosette galls are induced on other goldenrod species by other Asphondylia species.

Adults are very similar in appearance to Asphondylia monacha but the shape of the pupae differ between the two species.

Another gall midge, Youngomyia podophyllae, has been found in the galls of Asphondylia solidaginis but it is not known if it acts as an inquiline or as a parasitoid.

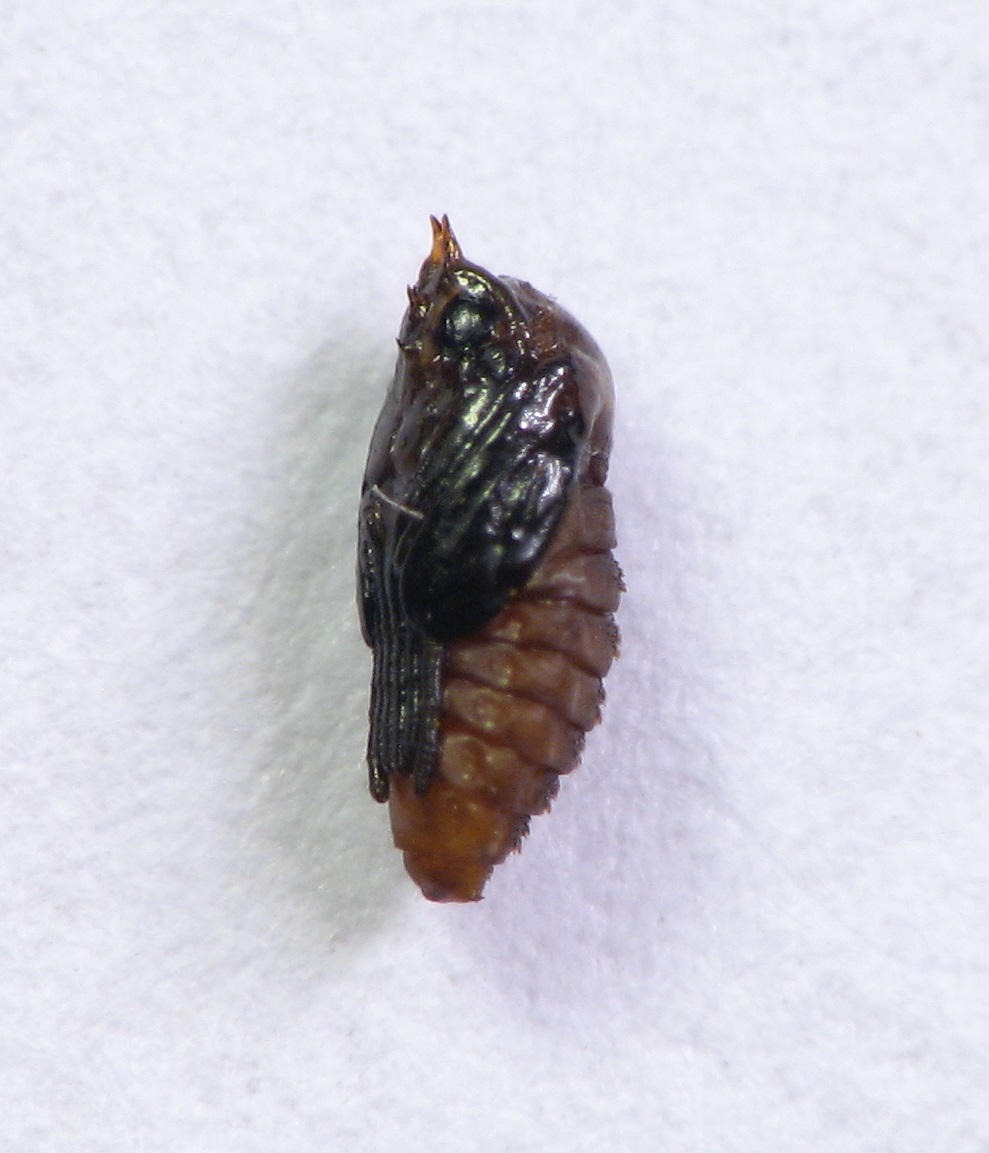
Pupa
