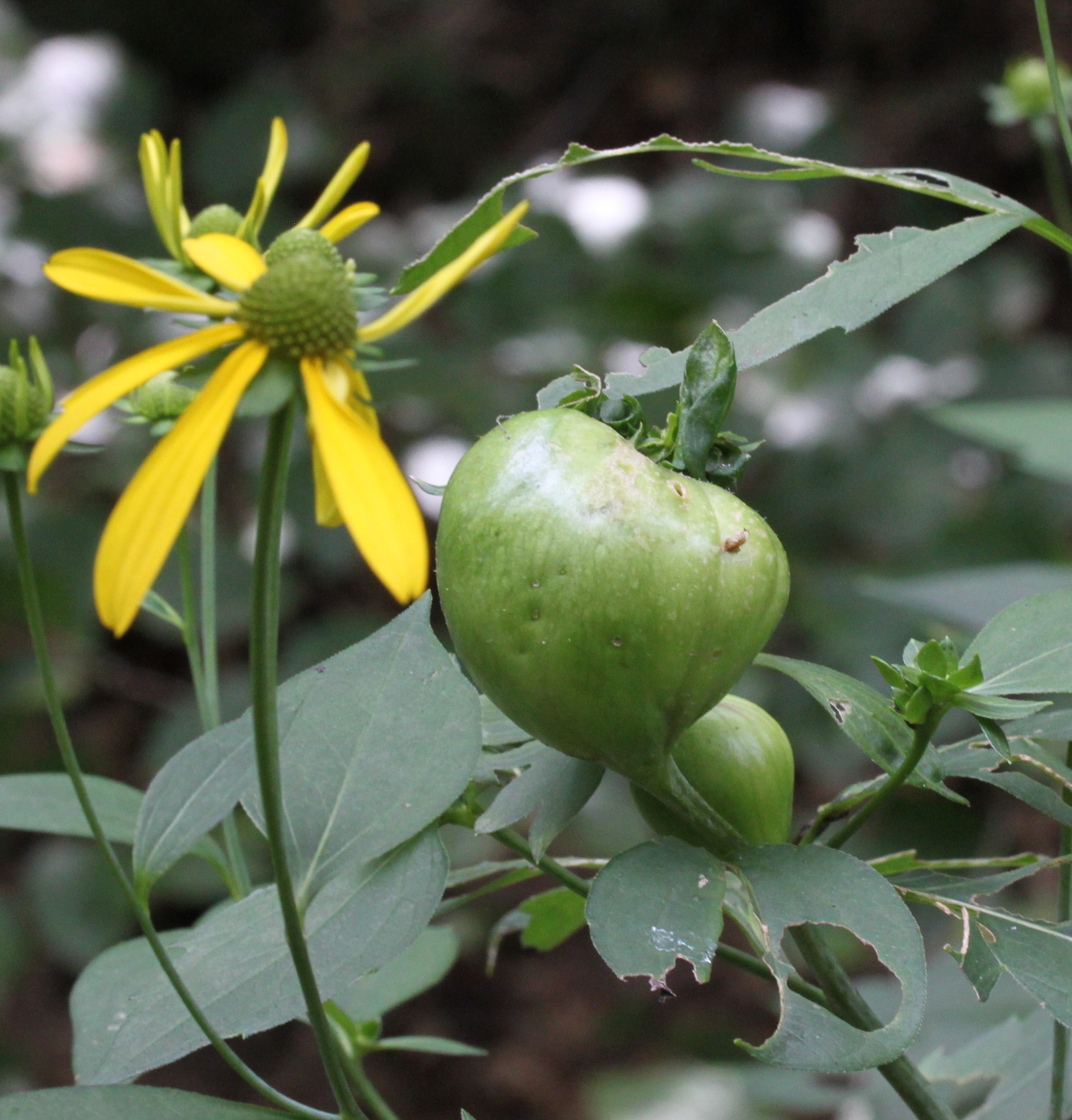
- Asphondylia floccosa gall

Scientific classification
- Kingdom: Animalia
- Phylum: Arthropoda
- Class: Insecta
- Order: Diptera
- Family: Cecidomyiidae
- Supertribe: Asphondyliidi
- Tribe: Asphondyliini
- Genus: Asphondylia
- Species: A. rudbeckiaeconspicua

Binomial name
- Asphondylia rudbeckiaeconspicua Osten Sacken, 1878

Synonyms
- Asphondylia conspicua Beutenmuller, 1907

= Asphondylia rudbeckiaeconspicua =

Species of fly

Asphondylia rudbeckiaeconspicua is a species of gall midges in the family Cecidomyiidae. The larvae induce galls on Rudbeckia laciniata in North America. It was first described by Carl Robert Osten-Sacken in 1878.
