= Asphondylia neomexicana =

Scientific classification
- Kingdom: Animalia
- Phylum: Arthropoda
- Class: Insecta
- Order: Diptera
- Family: Cecidomyiidae
- Genus: Asphondylia
- Species: A. neomexicana

Binomial name
- Asphondylia neomexicana (Cockerell, 1896)

Synonyms
- Cecidomyia neomexicana Cockerell, 1896

Species of fly

Asphondylia neomexicana is a species of gall midges in the family Cecidomyiidae.
