= Asphondylia prosopidis =

Scientific classification
- Kingdom: Animalia
- Phylum: Arthropoda
- Class: Insecta
- Order: Diptera
- Family: Cecidomyiidae
- Genus: Asphondylia
- Species: A. prosopidis

Binomial name
- Asphondylia prosopidis Cockerell, 1898

Species of fly

Asphondylia prosopidis, the mesquite gall midge, is a species of gall midges in the family Cecidomyiidae.
