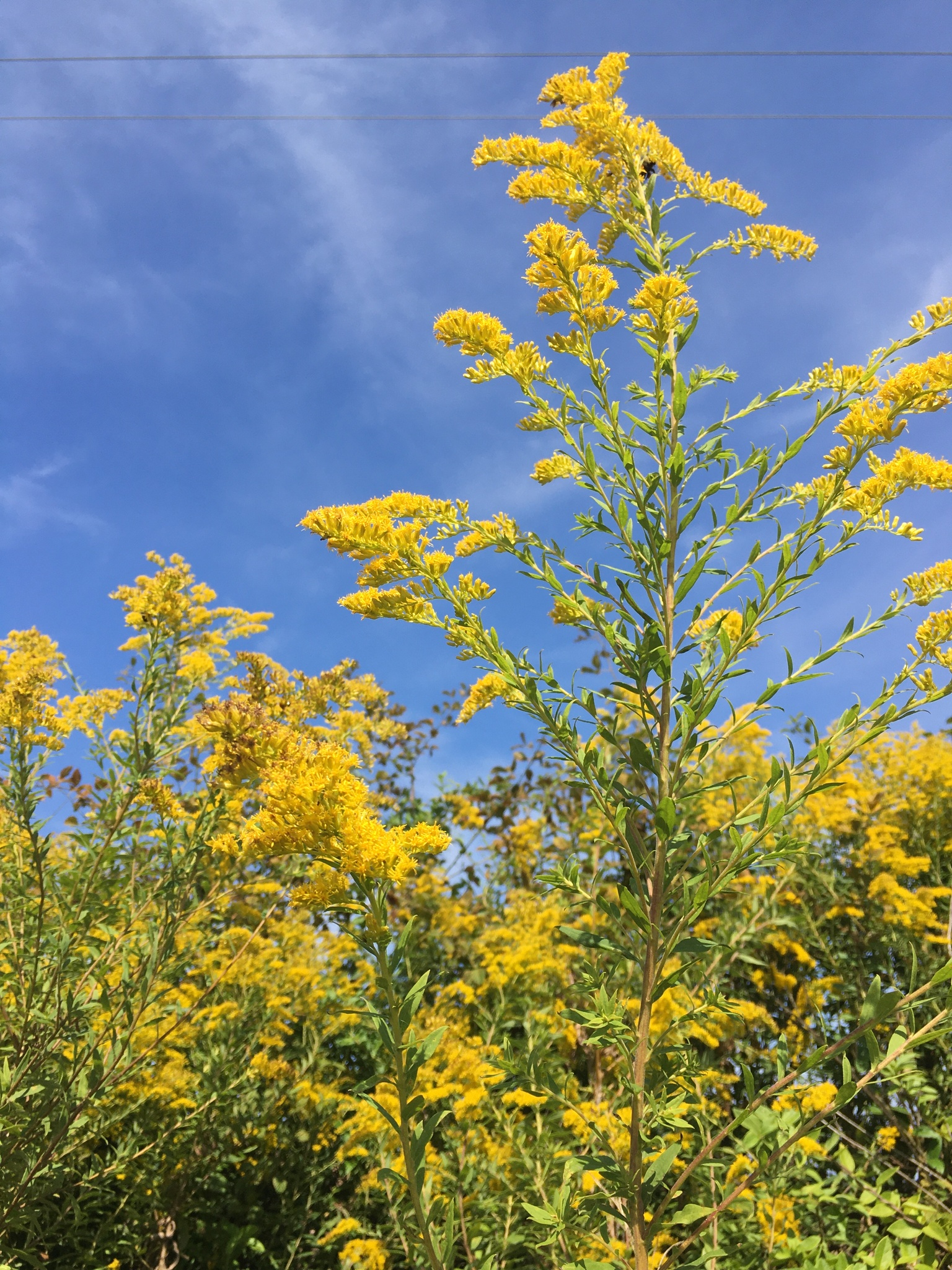

Conservation status
- Secure (NatureServe)

Scientific classification
- Kingdom: Plantae
- Clade: Tracheophytes
- Clade: Angiosperms
- Clade: Eudicots
- Clade: Asterids
- Order: Asterales
- Family: Asteraceae
- Genus: Solidago
- Species: S. altissima

Binomial name
- Solidago altissima L.

Subspecies
- S. altissima subsp. altissima; S. altissima subsp. gilvocanescens (Rydb.) Semple

Synonyms
- Species: Doria altissima var. procera Lunell; Euthamia scabra Greene; Solidago altissima var. canescens (A.Gray) M.C.Johnst.; Solidago altissima var. pluricephala M.C.Johnst.; Solidago altissima var. procera Fernald; Solidago canadensis subsp. altissima (L.) O.Bolòs & Vigo; Solidago canadensis var. canescens A.Gray; Solidago canadensis f. procera (Aiton) Voss; Solidago canadensis var. procera (Aiton) Torr. & A.Gray; Solidago hirsutissima var. procera (Aiton) D.S.Carp.; Solidago lunellii Rydb.; Solidago procera Aiton; Solidago procera var. salicifolia Nutt.; Solidago scabra Muhl. ex Torr. & A.Gray; subsp. gilvocanescens: Doria gilvocanescens Lunell; Solidago altissima var. gilvocanescens (Rydb.) Semple; Solidago canadensis subsp. gilvocanescens (Rydb.) Á.Löve & D.Löve; Solidago canadensis var. gilvocanescens Rydb.; Solidago canescens subsp. gilvocanescens (Rydb.) Á.Löve & D.Löve; Solidago gilvocanescens Rydb.; Solidago pruinosa Greene

= Solidago altissima =

Species of flowering plant

Solidago altissima, the tall goldenrod or late goldenrod, is a North American species of goldenrod in the family Asteraceae which is widespread across much of Canada, the United States, and northern Mexico. It is common in much of its range and fairly tolerant of landscapes which have been disturbed by humans. It has become naturalized in many parts of the world.

== Description ==
Solidago altissima is one to two meters (40 to 80 inches) in height with fine hairs on the stem. The leaves are located along the stem, not in a rosette near the ground. One plant can produce as many as 1500 small yellow flower heads in a large conical array. The involucres of the main subspecies (S. a. subsp. altissima) are usually 3–4 millimeters, whereas those of S. a. subsp. gilvocanescens are usually 2–3 mm.

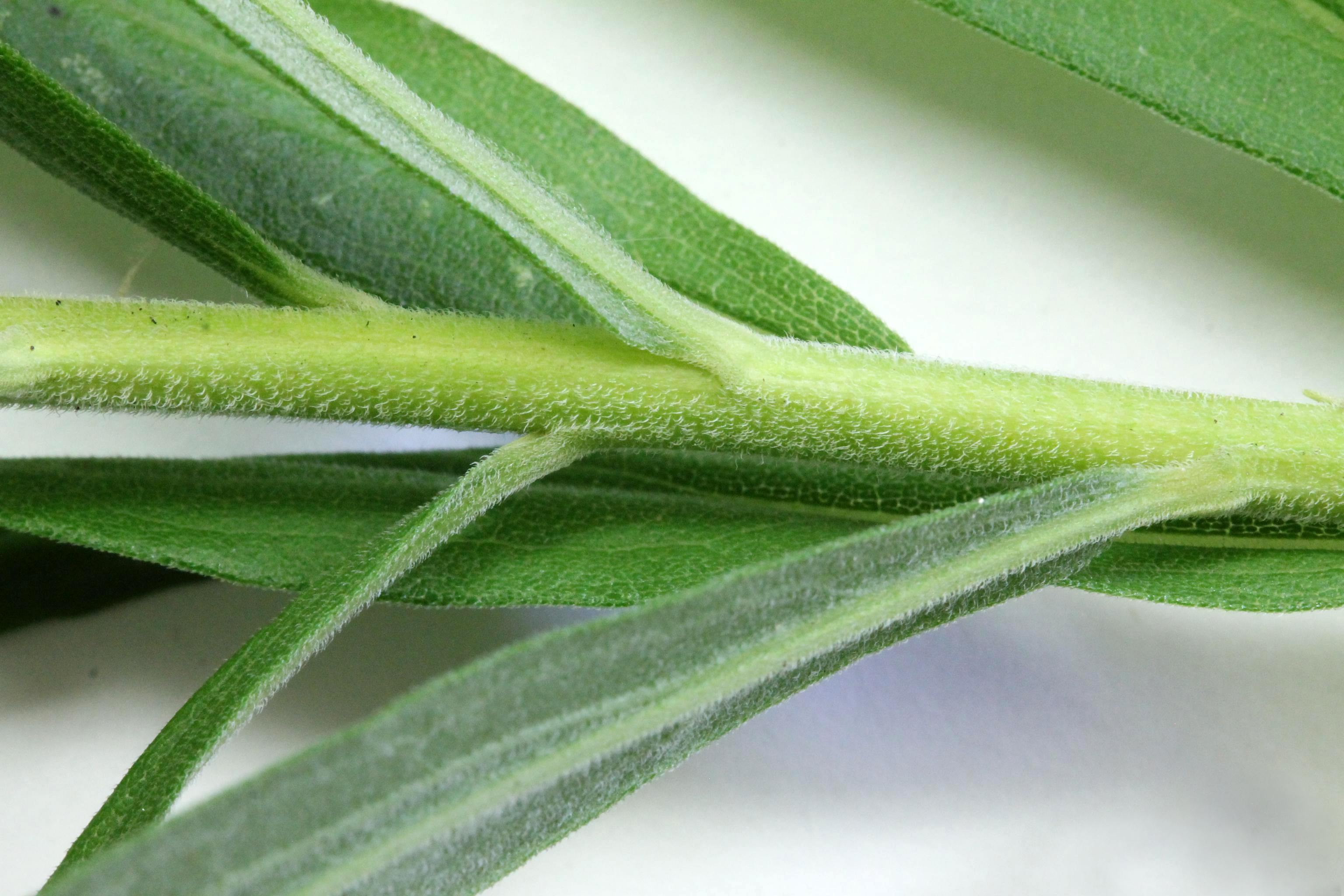
Upper stem of S. altissima

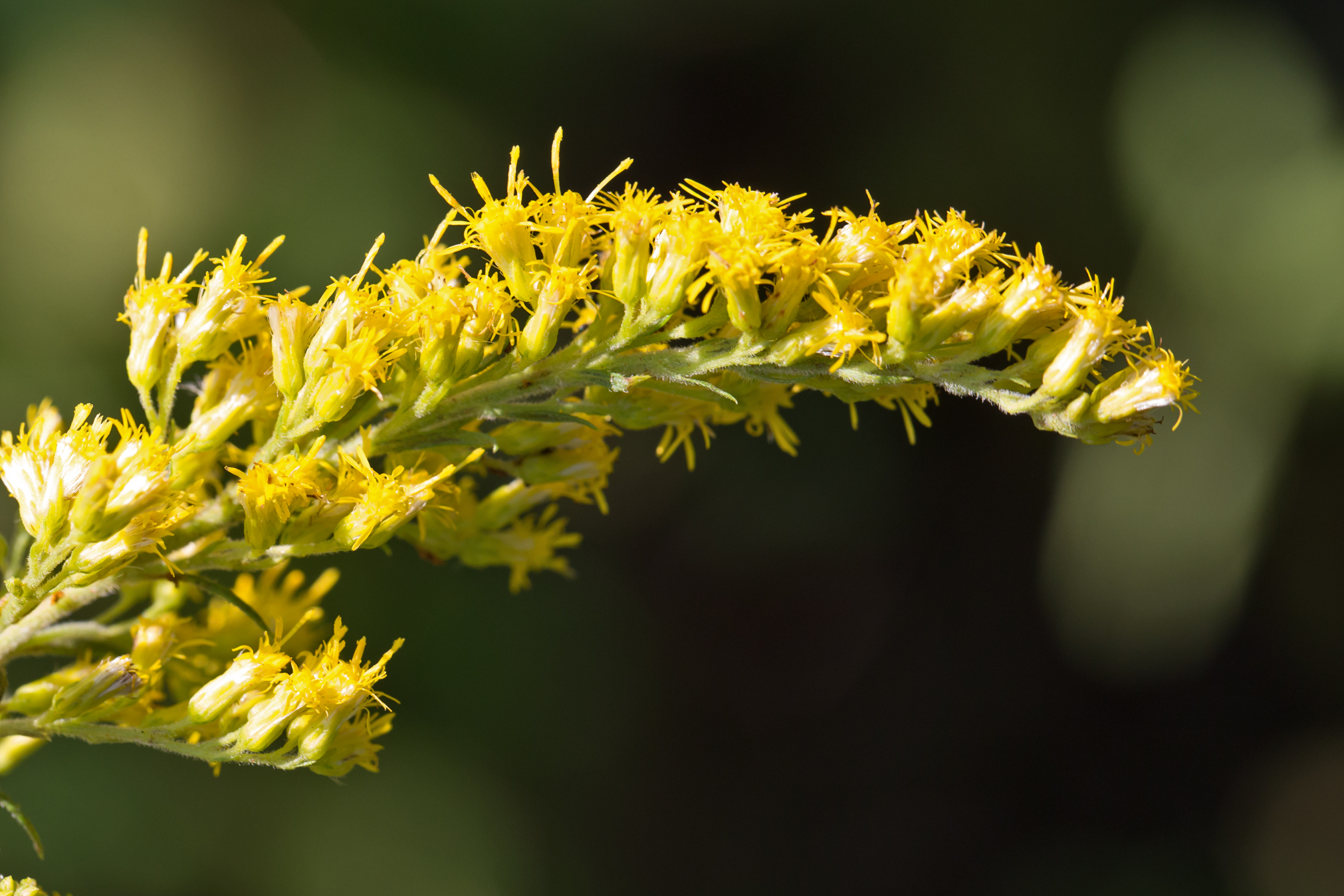
Inflorescence of S. altissima

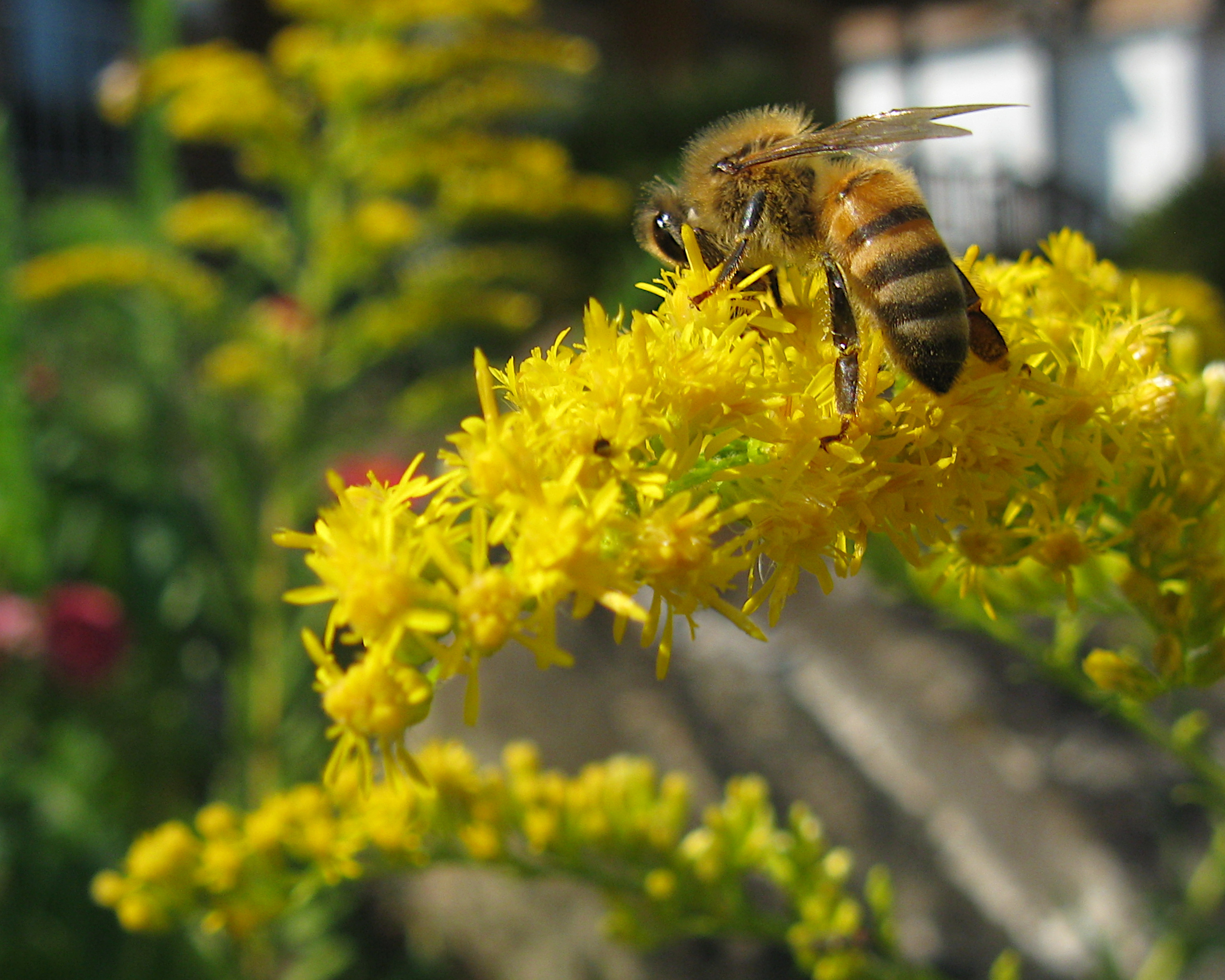
S. altissima with a pollinator

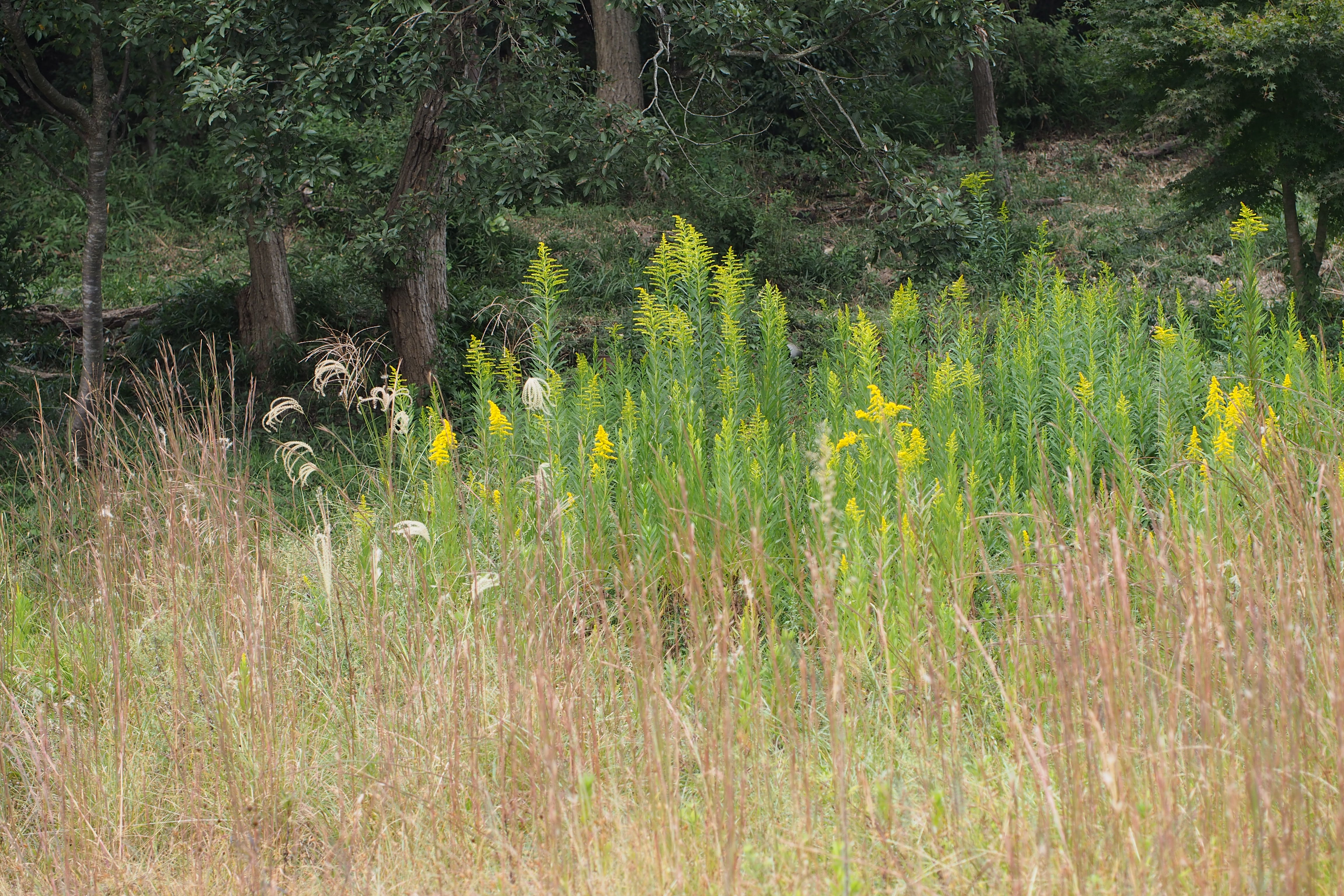
Colony of S. altissima in Japan

=== Chromosomes ===
Solidago altissima has a base number of nine chromosomes (x = 9). Diploid, tetraploid, and hexaploid plants with respective chromosome counts of 18, 36, and 54 have been reported among the two subspecies.

== Taxonomy ==
Solidago altissima has diploid, tetraploid, and hexaploid populations as well as morphological variations which have generally led to classifying it into two subspecies. Roughly speaking, these subspecies can be identified as being from the eastern and western parts of the North American continent. At least in the Midwest, it is common to have plants of different ploidy interspersed, with little apparent tendency for one type to dominate even a fairly local geographical area.

Within Solidago, S. altissima is part of the Solidago canadensis species complex, which is classified in the subsection Triplinervae. S. altissima sometimes has been classified as an infraspecies of S. canadensis.

Subspecies

- Solidago altissima subsp. altissima is the autonym.
- Solidago altissima subsp. gilvocanescens (Rydb.) Semple differs from the autonym by range and has a smaller involucre size.

== Distribution and habitat ==
S. altissima is widespread across much of Canada, the United States, and northern Mexico. It is common in much of its range and fairly tolerant of landscapes which have been disturbed by humans.

S. a. subsp. altissima is in eastern Canada except Newfoundland and Labrador, and it is in the provinces of Saskatchewan and Manitoba. In the United States, it is east of the Mississippi River except Wisconsin, Illinois, and North Carolina; all U.S. states directly on the west of the Mississippi River; and, Nebraska, Kansas, Oklahoma, Texas, Utah, Arizona, and California. In Mexico, it is in the north except on the Baja California Peninsula, Sonora, and Sinaloa. It is in all other states as far south as Oaxaca and Veracruz except Mexico, Morelos, Puebla, Tlaxcala, and Mexico City. It is native in all of the above states and provinces where it resides. It is an introduced species in East China, South Central China, Taiwan, New South Wales, Korea, and Transcaucasus.

S. a. subsp. gilvocanescens (Rydb.) Semple is in western Canada and Ontario. In the United States, it is only east of the Mississippi River in Illinois and is then distributed west through the Great Plains states. In Mexico, it overlaps S. a. subsp. altissima except in the west.

== Ecology ==
=== Reproduction ===
Solidago altissima is self-incompatible, meaning that the pollen from one plant cannot pollinate the female flower parts of the same plant.

Solidago altissima is insect pollinated and is recorded to have been visited in northern Florida by Augochloropsis metallica, Bombus bimaculatus, Bombus impatiens, Lasioglossum apopkense, Lasioglossum reticulatum, Lasioglossum weemsi/leviense, Melissodes dentiventris, Melissodes manipularis, and Pseudopanurgus solidaginus.

=== Herbivory defense ===
==== Galls ====
This species is host to the following insect induced galls:

- Asphondylia monacha Osten Sacken, 1869 (spring generation only)
- Asphondylia solidaginis Beutenmuller, 1907 (bud), (leaf snap)
- Asteromyia carbonifera (Osten Sacken, 1862)
- Asteromyia tumifica (Beutenmuller, 1907)
- Epiblema scudderiana (Clemens, 1860)
- Eurosta solidaginis (Fitch, 1855)
- Gnorimoschema gallaesolidaginis (Fitch, 1855)
- Procecidochares atra (Loew, 1862) (summer and autumn generations)
- Rhopalomyia anthophila (Osten Sacken, 1869)
- Rhopalomyia clarkei
- Rhopalomyia racemicola
- Rhopalomyia solidaginis (spring, summer, and autumn generations)
- Rhopalomyia thompsoni
- Schizomyia racemicola
- Tephritis pura
- Calycomyza solidaginis Kaltenbach, 1869

External link to gallformers

==== Chemical ====
S. altissima produce cysteine and serine protease inhibitors as an inducible defense against herbivory. These protease inhibitors can negatively affect the digestive system of herbivores slowing growth and reproduction making them an effective mean of resistance. The production of these inhibitors is costly and can vary between populations, possibly being lower in areas that are not subject to as much predation.

==== Ducking ====
Ducking has been found to occur in populations of S. altissima as a defense mechanism. This is a process in which certain individuals within a population will bow until their tops point downward in an effort to hide from egg laying insects. This bowing is temporary, only occurring during the egg laying period of species that use the plant as a host, such as goldenrod gall fly (Eurosta solidaginis) and the goldenrod bunch gall midge (Rhopalomyia solidaginis). Insect species inject their eggs into goldenrod buds causing spherical swelling on the plant known as a gall. Members of the population with this "candy-cane" phenotype experience a lower chance of hosting eggs and having galls formed by these herbivores.

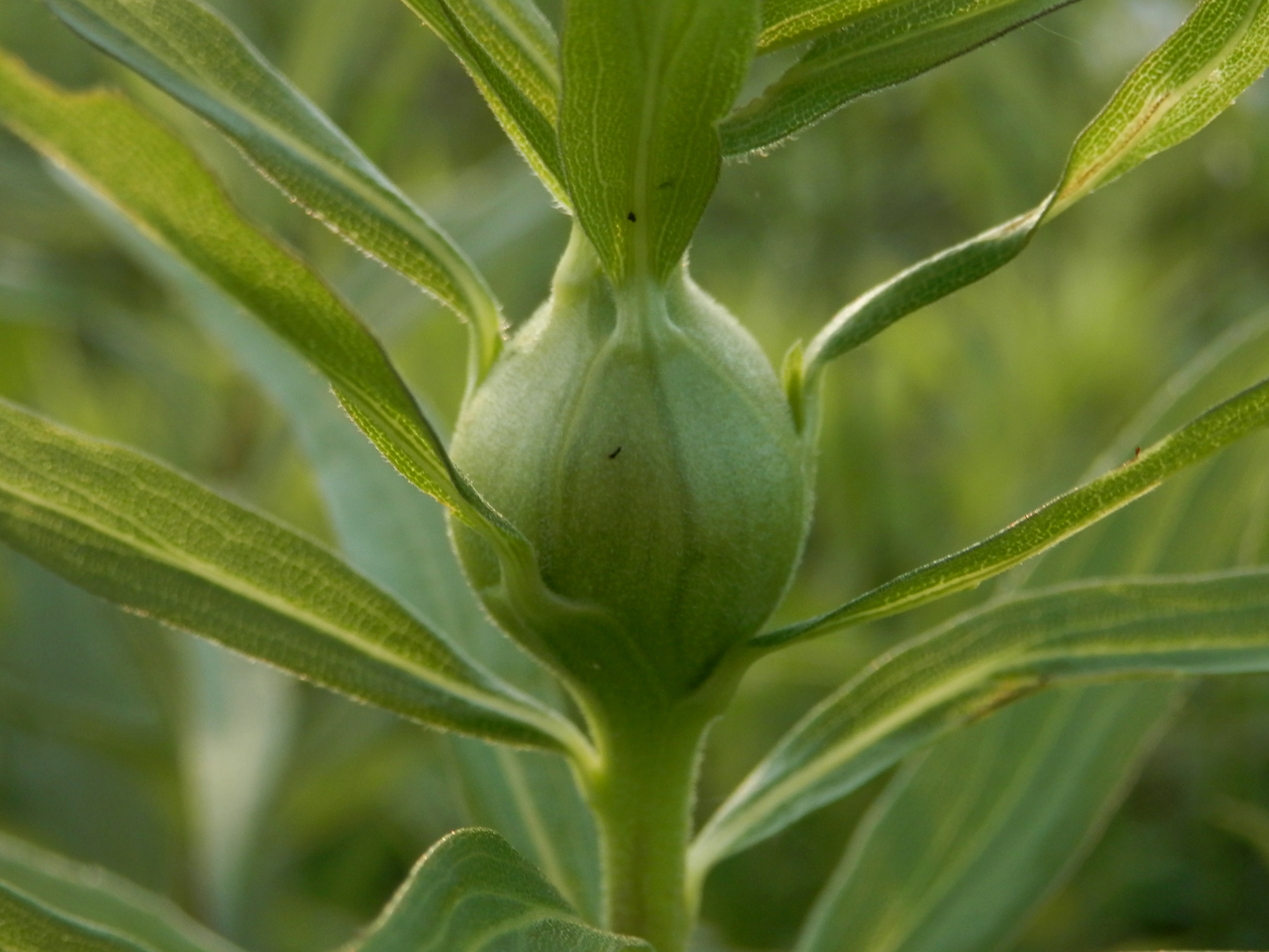
Gall of the goldenrod gall fly (Eurosta solidaginis) on Solidago altissima in Guelph, Ontario

Individuals that undergo ducking are in the minority, with most individuals staying upright through growth and flowering. This genetic phenomenon, of two stem growth phenotypes within one species, is a form of dimorphism. Though ducking provides S. altissima with the benefit of being able to avoid damage from insect oviposition, the fact that it occurs in a low number of individuals in populations suggests that there is a cost to having this trait, possibly preventing it from becoming the major phenotype.

== Conservation ==
As of 2022, NatureServe listed Solidago altissima as Secure (G5) worldwide. It is Imperiled (S2) in Maine and New Brunswick and Critically Imperiled (S1) on Prince Edward Island. Its global status was last reviewed by NatureServe in May 2016.

== Use as a natural dye ==
Like other goldenrod species, the leaves and inflorescences of tall goldenrod are widely used as a natural dye. Depending on the use of mordants, the growing conditions of the plant, and whether the plant is subject to gall-inducing herbivores, colors range from bright yellow to deep olive green.
