= Heteromeles =

- A fruiting toyon in San Diego County

Conservation status
- Least Concern (IUCN 3.1)

Scientific classification
- Kingdom: Plantae
- Clade: Tracheophytes
- Clade: Angiosperms
- Clade: Eudicots
- Clade: Rosids
- Order: Rosales
- Family: Rosaceae
- Subfamily: Amygdaloideae
- Tribe: Maleae
- Subtribe: Malinae
- Genus: Heteromeles; M.Roem. nom. cons. 1847
- Species: H. arbutifolia

Binomial name
- Heteromeles arbutifolia (Lindl.) M.Roem.
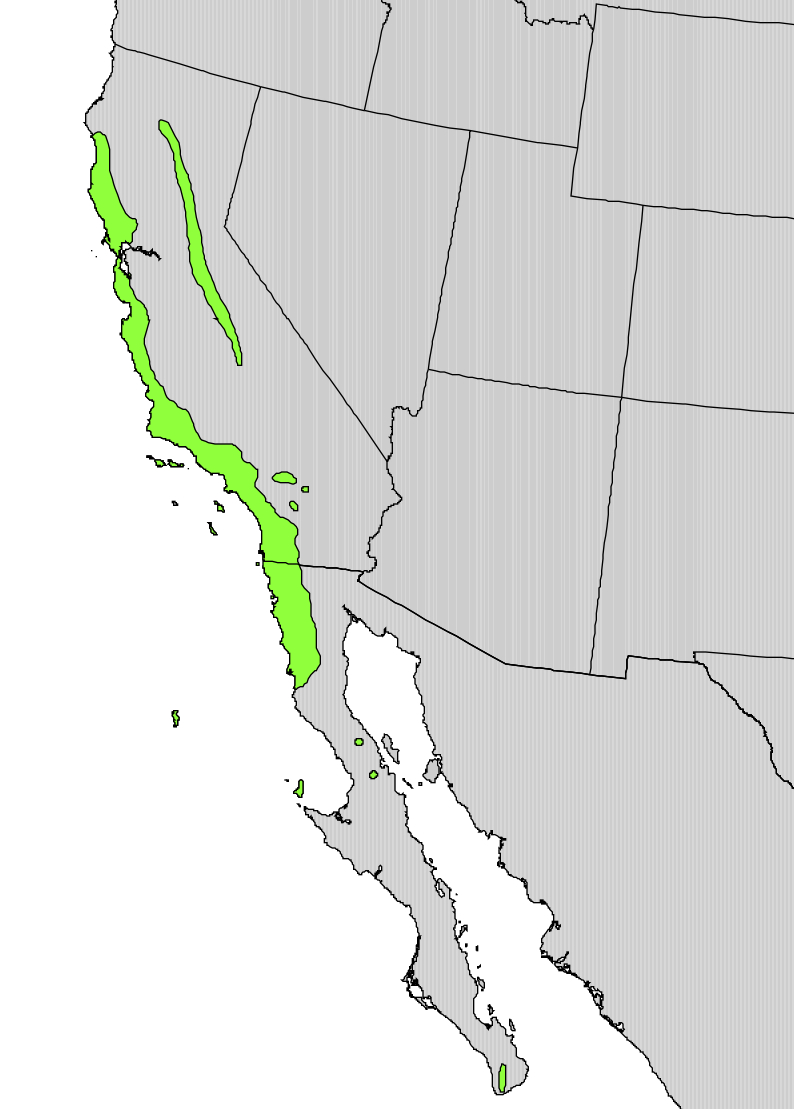
- Natural range

Synonyms
- Photinia arbutifolia Lindl.; Crataegus arbutifolia W.T.Aiton nom. illeg.; Heteromeles fremontiana Decaisne; Heteromeles salicifolia (C.Presl) Abrams; Photinia salicifolia C.Presl

Genus of plants (AKA toyon; perennial shrub)

Heteromeles arbutifolia (/ˌhɛtɪroʊˈmiːliːz ɑːrˌbjuːtɪˈfoʊliə/, more commonly /ˌhɛtəˈrɒməliːz/ by Californian botanists), commonly known as toyon, is a perennial evergreen shrub or small tree with distinctive red fruits native to California, Oregon and Mexico. It is the sole species in the genus Heteromeles.

== Description ==
Toyon typically grows from 2–5 meters (7–16 ft), rarely up to 10 m in shaded conditions, and has a rounded to irregular top. Its leaves are evergreen, alternate, sharply toothed, have short petioles, and are 5–10 centimeters (2–4 in) in length and 2–4 cm (0.8–1.6 in) wide. In the early summer it produces small white flowers 6–10 millimeters (1/4–3/8 in) diameter in dense terminal corymbs. Flowering peaks in June.

The five petals are rounded. The fruit is a small pome, 5–10 mm across, bright red and berry-like, produced in large quantities, developing in August or September and maturing in December.

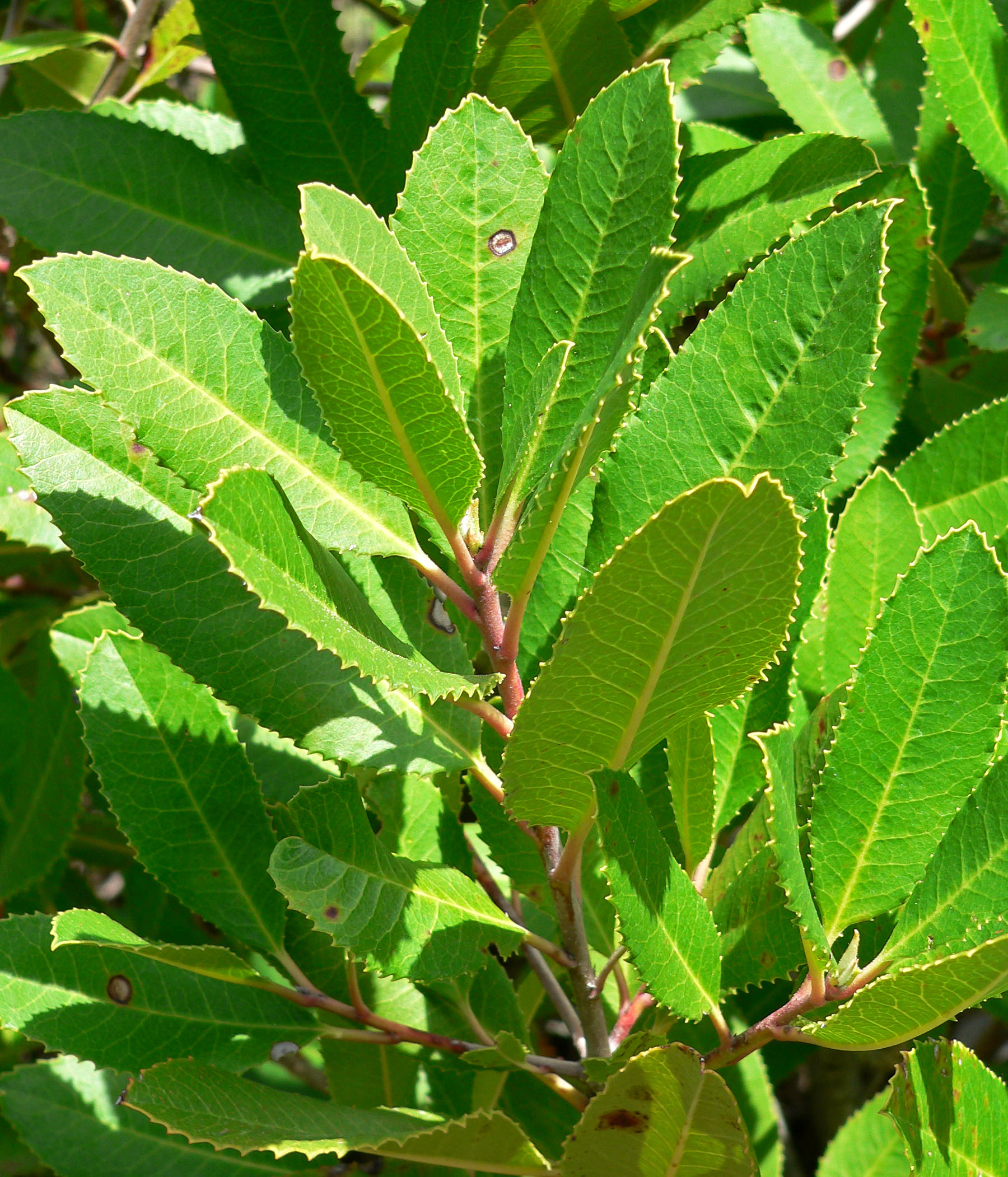
Leaves

H. arbutifolia flowers

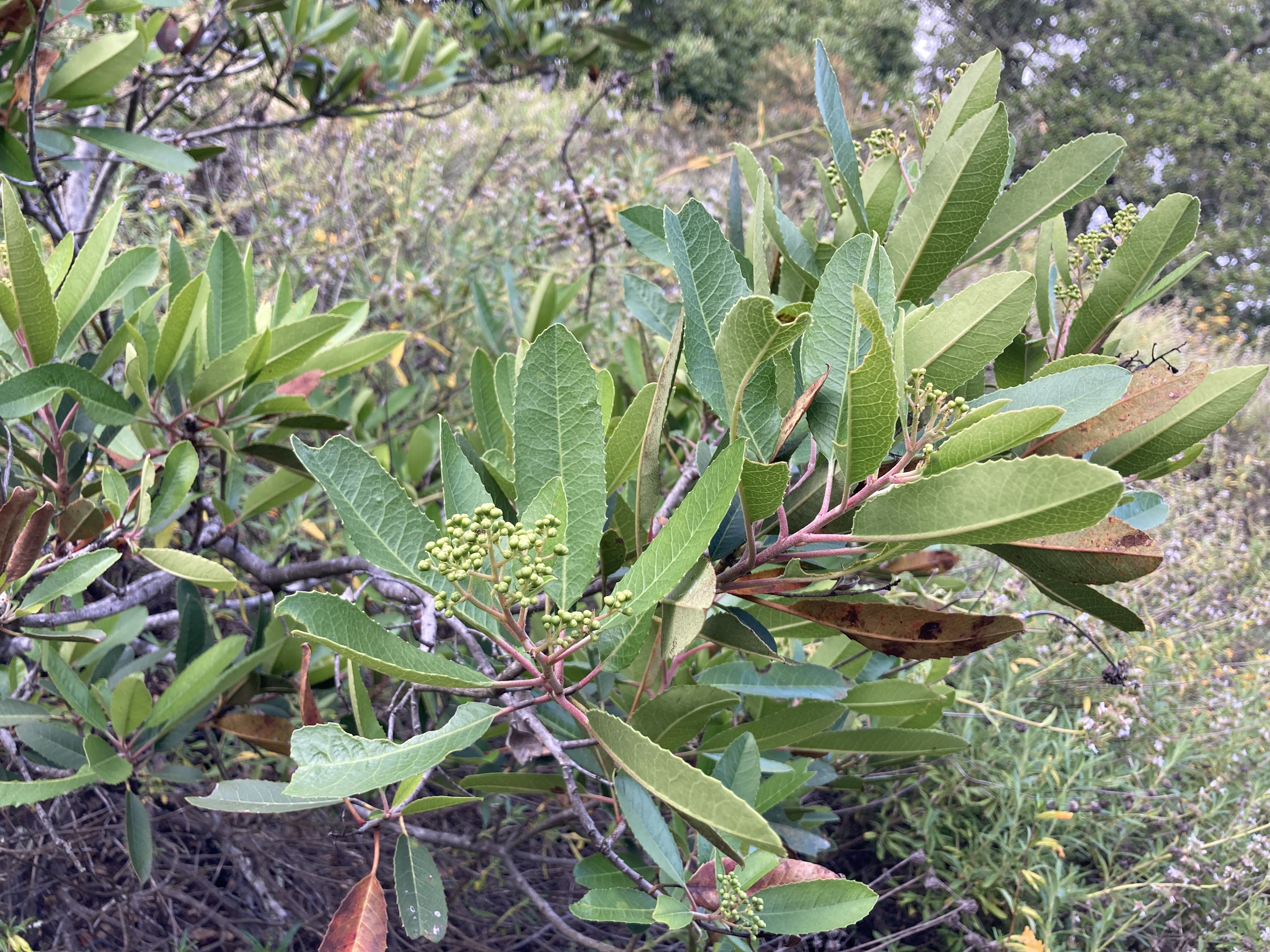
Unopened flower buds at Briones Regional Park

Immature pomes

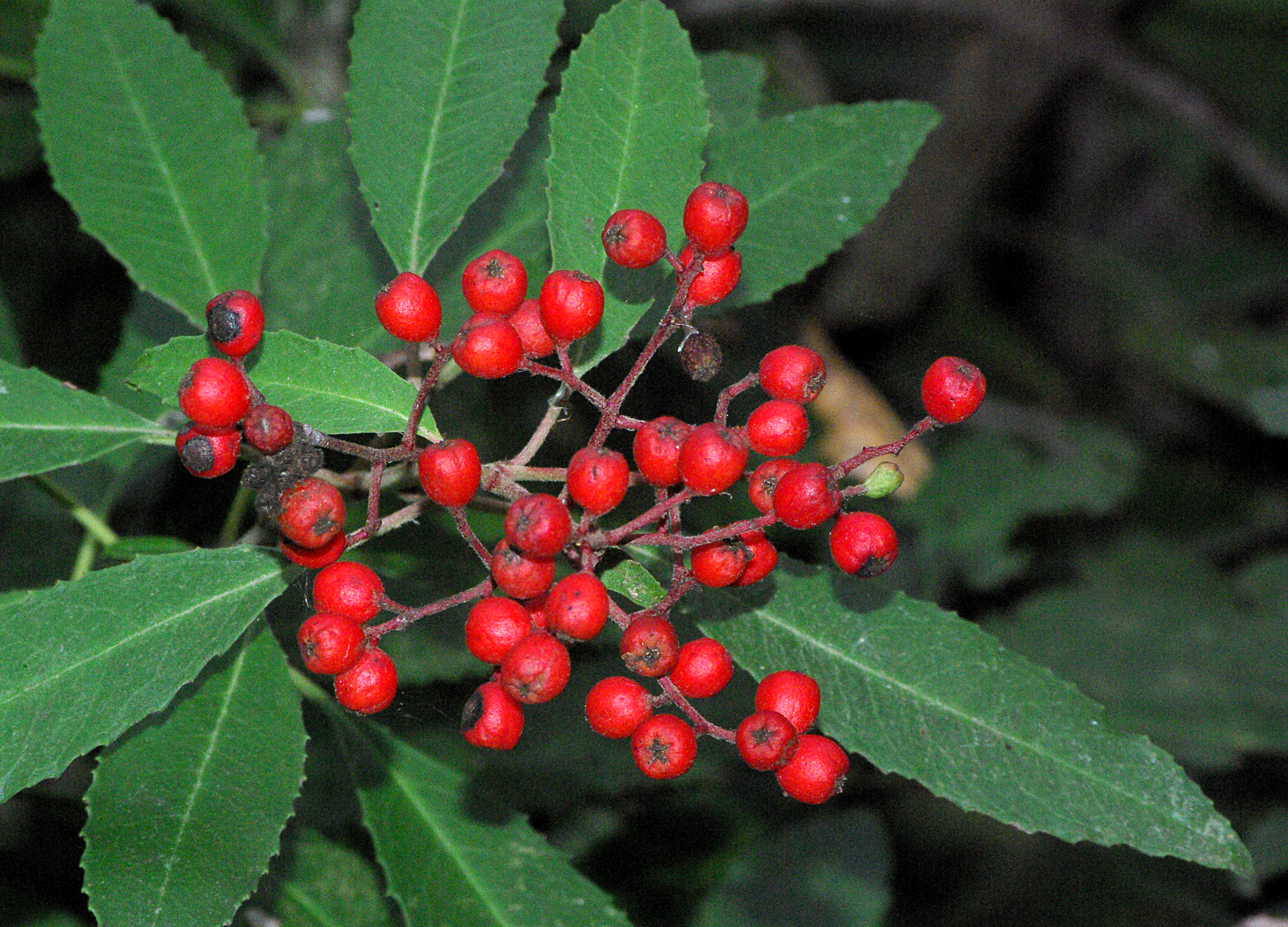
Fruit

== Taxonomy ==
The genera Photinia, Aronia, Pourthiaea, and Stranvaesia have historically been variously combined by different taxonomists. The genus Heteromeles as originally published by Max Joseph Roemer was monospecific, including Photinia arbutifolia Lindl. (1820), as H. arbutifolia (Lindl.) M.Roem, but the name was illegitimate (superfluous) because it included the type of the genus Photinia. This has since been corrected by conservation, and the name is therefore often written as Heteromeles M.Roem. nom. cons. (1847).

=== Varieties ===
- Heteromeles arbutifolia var. arbutifolia (Lindl.) M.Roem. – autonym
- Heteromeles arbutifolia var. cerina (Jeps.) A.E.Murray – representative of the yellow fruiting specimens of the plant; sporadic in distribution, and not accepted by most taxonomical authorities.
- Heteromeles arbutifolia var. macrocarpa (Munz) Munz (Island Christmas berry or island toyon) – a very rare insular variety limited to the Channel Islands of San Clemente and Santa Catalina and the Mexican Pacific island of Guadalupe. Characterized by shorter, broader, significantly larger leaves with revolute margins and little teeth, and floriferous inflorescences with larger fruits (8 to 10 mm). It is more susceptible to fungal infections of Spilocaea than the common toyon.

== Distribution and habitat ==
Toyon fruiting in chaparral on Black Mountain, San Diego County, California

It is native to extreme southwest Oregon, California, and the Baja California Peninsula.

Toyon is a prominent component of the coastal sage scrub plant community, and is a part of drought-adapted chaparral and mixed oak woodland habitats. It is also known by the common names Christmas berry and California holly.

== Ecology ==
Mature toyon fruit is eaten by many wildlife species, especially birds. The fruit are consumed by California quail, mockingbirds, band-tailed pigeons, American robins, cedar waxwings, hermit thrushes and raccoons. The tall shrub communities in which toyons grow also provide nesting and hiding cover for birds and small mammals. The plants are visited frequently by butterflies.

Toyon persists in the fire-prone chaparral environment with vigorous resprouting: seeds are destroyed in fire and the plant requires fire free periods for successful seedling establishment and population expansion.

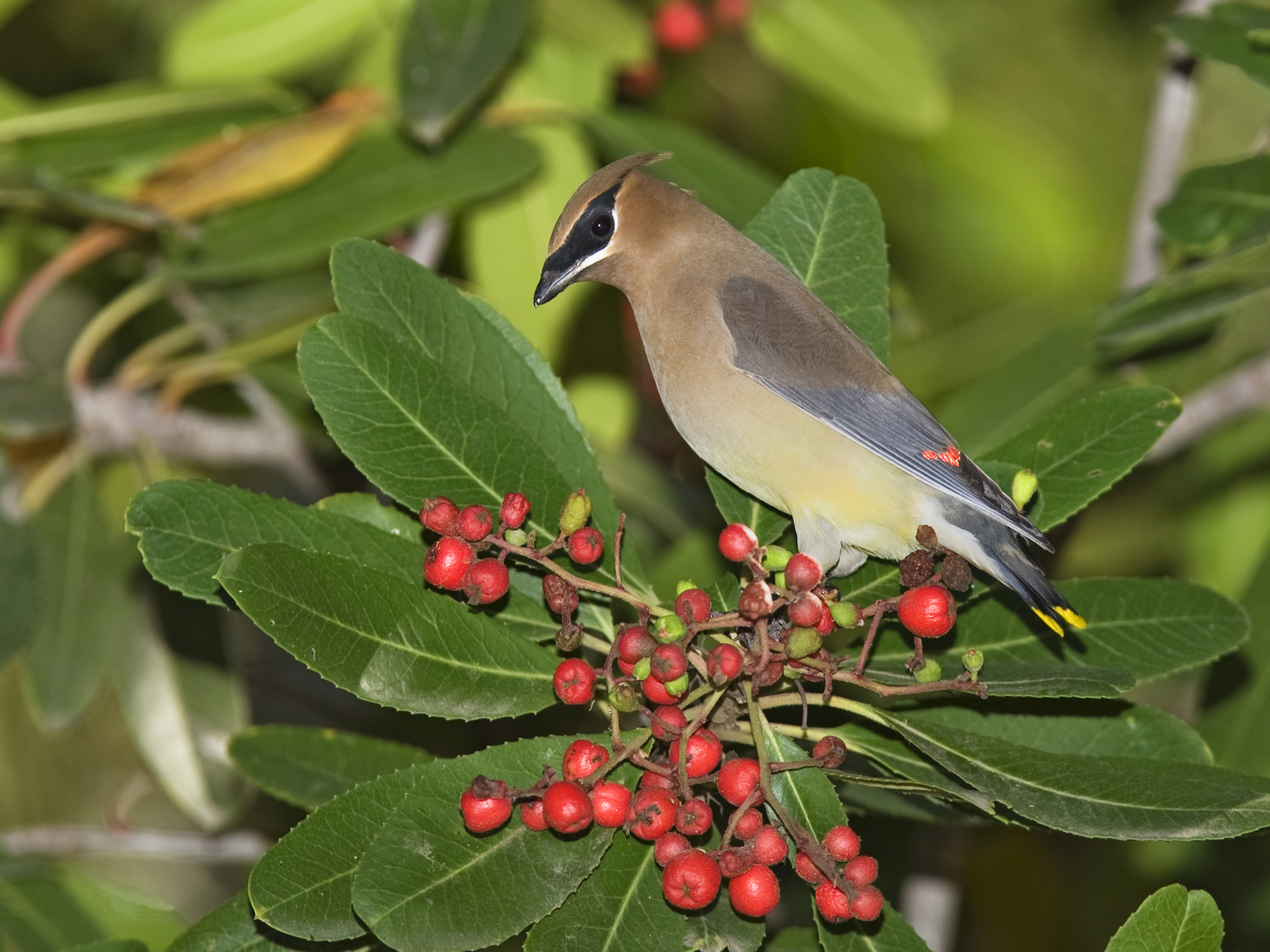
Cedar waxwing consuming the pomes

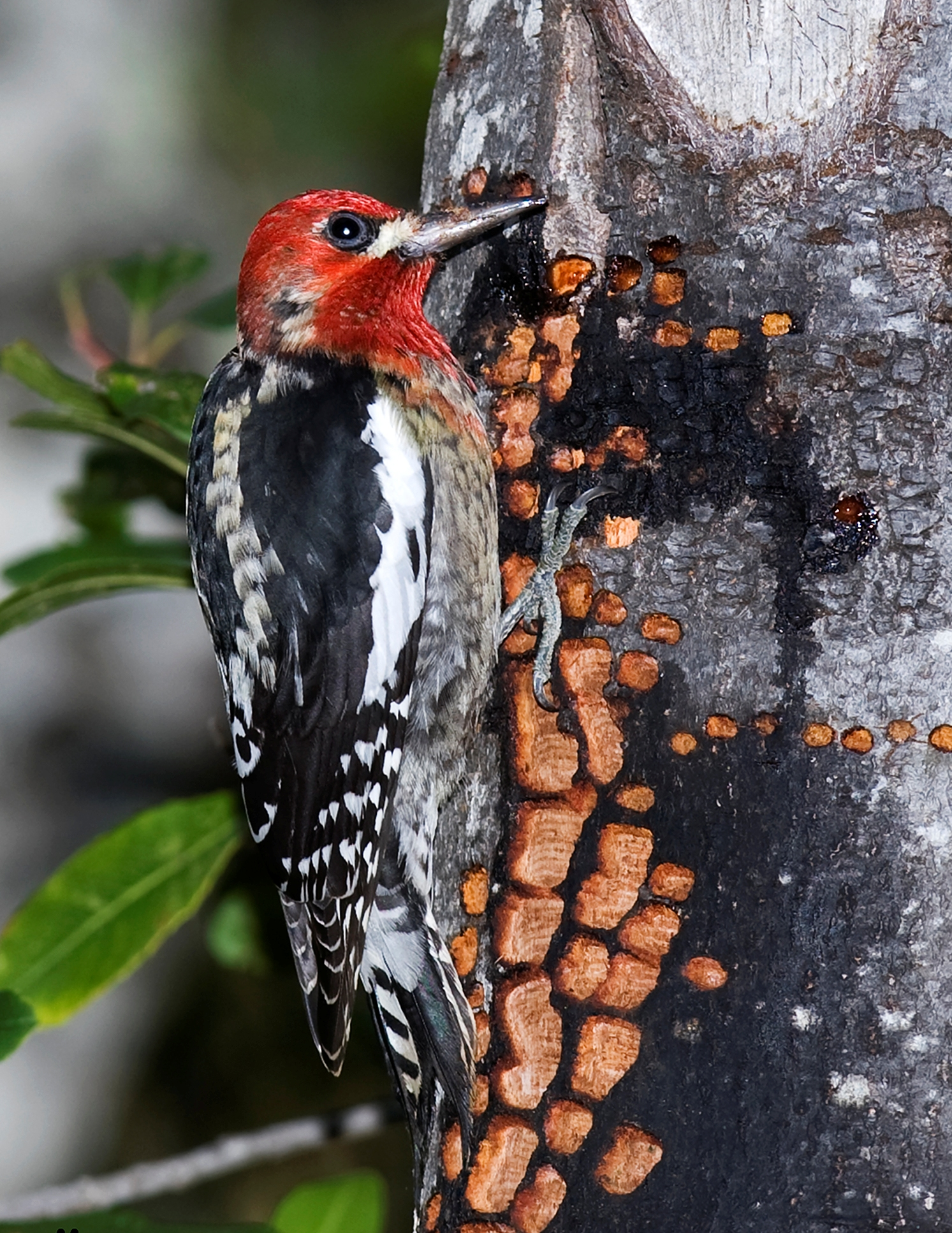
Red-breasted Sapsucker drilling for sap on a toyon trunk

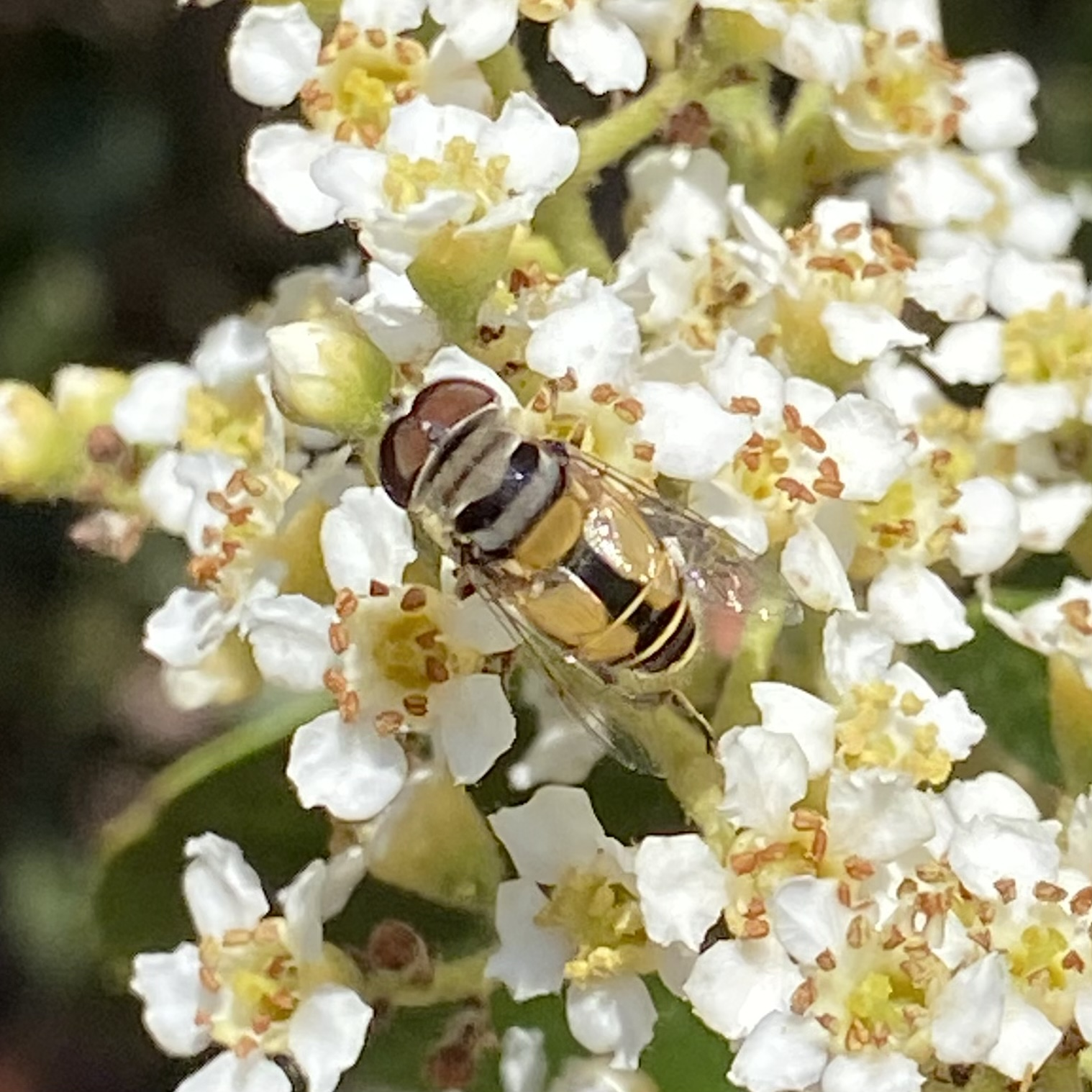
Palpada alhambra feeding on nectar

== Toxicity ==
Toyon pomes are acidic and astringent, and contain a small amount of cyanogenic glycosides, which break down into hydrocyanic acid on digestion. This is removed by mild cooking. Most fruit from plants in the family Rosaceae, including apples, apricots, peaches, cherries, and plums, contain cyanide.

A 2016 study found 5 g of the dried berries (used as a treatment for Alzheimer's) to be safe. The study also found no cyanogenic compounds in the plant.

== Uses ==
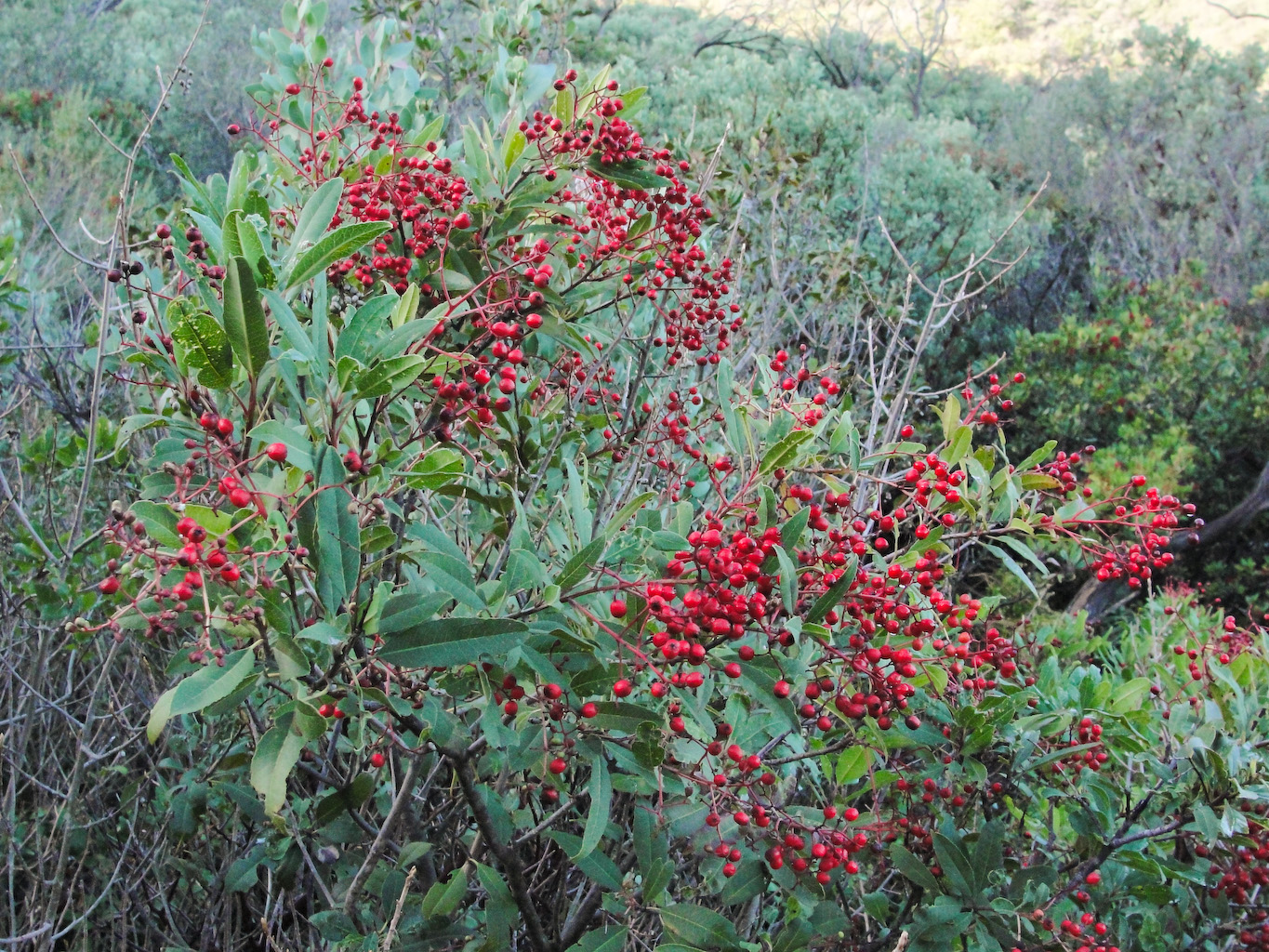
Plant fruiting on Mount Diablo, Contra Costa County

=== Indigenous Uses ===
Toyon is known by several names to different Indigenous tribes and linguistic groups (Tongva and ʔívil̃uqaletem: ashuwet; Barbareño, Cruzeño, and Inseño Chumashan languages: qwe').

The pomes provided food for local Native American tribes, such as the Chumash, Tongva, and Tataviam. The pomes also can be made into a jelly. Native Americans also made a tea from the leaves as a stomach remedy. Most were dried and stored, then later cooked into porridge or pancakes. Later settlers added sugar to make custard and wine. The plants were also often cooked over a fire to remove the slightly bitter taste by Californian tribes.

The Tongva ate the berries fresh, boiled and left them in an earthen oven for 2 to 3 days, roasted them, or made them into a cider. Pulverized flowers were steeped into hot water to make tea which could be used to ease gynecological ailments. For stomach pains, bark and leaves are steeped in hot water to make tea. The same tea can serve as a seasonal tonic and ease other body pains. Also, applying mashed ashuwet to sores eases pain. Infected wounds are washed using an infusion of bark and leaves. The ʔívil̃uqaletem often consumed the fruit both raw and cooked.

=== Phytochemistry ===
The plant has been used as a treatment for Alzheimer's disease by indigenous people of California and recent research has found a number of active compounds that are potentially beneficial to Alzheimer's treatment. These include icariside compounds, which protect the blood-brain barrier and prevent infiltration of inflammatory cells into the brain.

=== Cultivation ===
Toyon is cultivated as an ornamental shrub, but can be trained into a multi-stemmed small tree: a shape that must be maintained by constant pruning. It grows in sun or partial shade and prefers well drained soil. Established plants are drought tolerant, making it suitable for xeriscape gardening. Toyon can be grown in domestic gardens and has been cultivated as an ornamental plant in southern England at the Ventnor Botanic Garden.

Like many other genera in the Rosaceae tribe Maleae, toyon includes some cultivars that are susceptible to fireblight. Toyon is less of a fire hazard than some chaparral plants.

== In culture ==
In 1921, collecting toyon branches for Christmas became so popular in Los Angeles that the State of California passed a law forbidding collecting on public land or on any land not owned by the person picking any plant without the landowner's written permission (CA Penal Code § 384a).

Toyon was adopted as the official native plant of the city of Los Angeles by the LA City Council on April 17, 2012.

== See also ==
- California native plants
- Asphondylia photiniae – midge-induced galls on toyon berries
