= Asphondylia ratibidae =

Scientific classification
- Kingdom: Animalia
- Phylum: Arthropoda
- Class: Insecta
- Order: Diptera
- Family: Cecidomyiidae
- Genus: Asphondylia
- Species: A. ratibidae

Binomial name
- Asphondylia ratibidae Felt, 1935

Species of fly

Asphondylia ratibidae is a species of gall midges in the family Cecidomyiidae.
