= Asphondylia websteri =

Scientific classification
- Kingdom: Animalia
- Phylum: Arthropoda
- Class: Insecta
- Order: Diptera
- Family: Cecidomyiidae
- Genus: Asphondylia
- Species: A. websteri

Binomial name
- Asphondylia websteri Felt, 1917

Species of fly

Asphondylia websteri, the alfalfa gall midge, is a species of gall midges in the family Cecidomyiidae.
