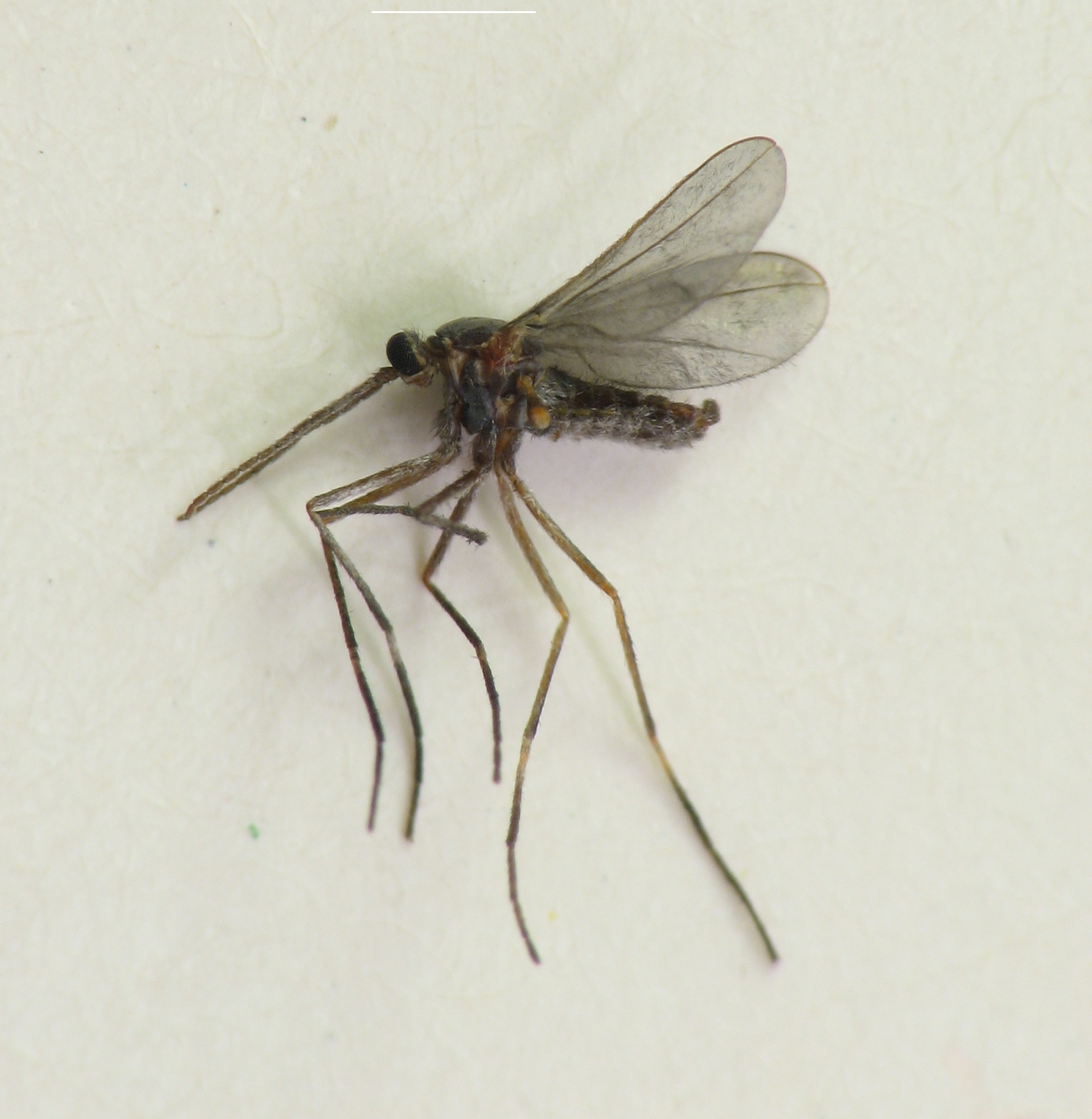
- Asphondylia solidaginis

Scientific classification
- Domain: Eukaryota
- Kingdom: Animalia
- Phylum: Arthropoda
- Class: Insecta
- Order: Diptera
- Family: Cecidomyiidae
- Tribe: Asphondyliini
- Genus: Asphondylia

= Asphondylia =

Genus of flies

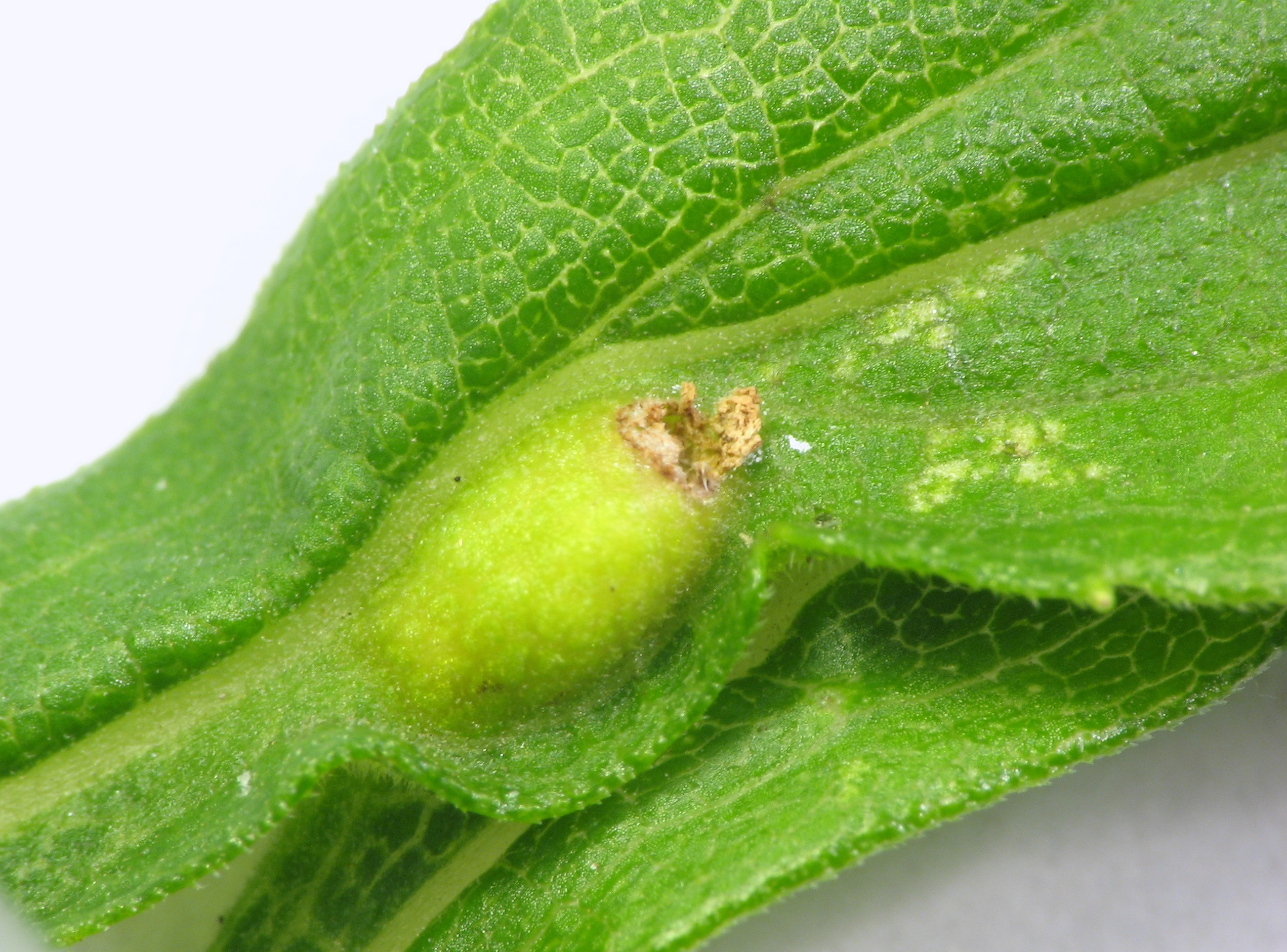
Asphondylia solidaginis, gall in goldenrod (Solidago)

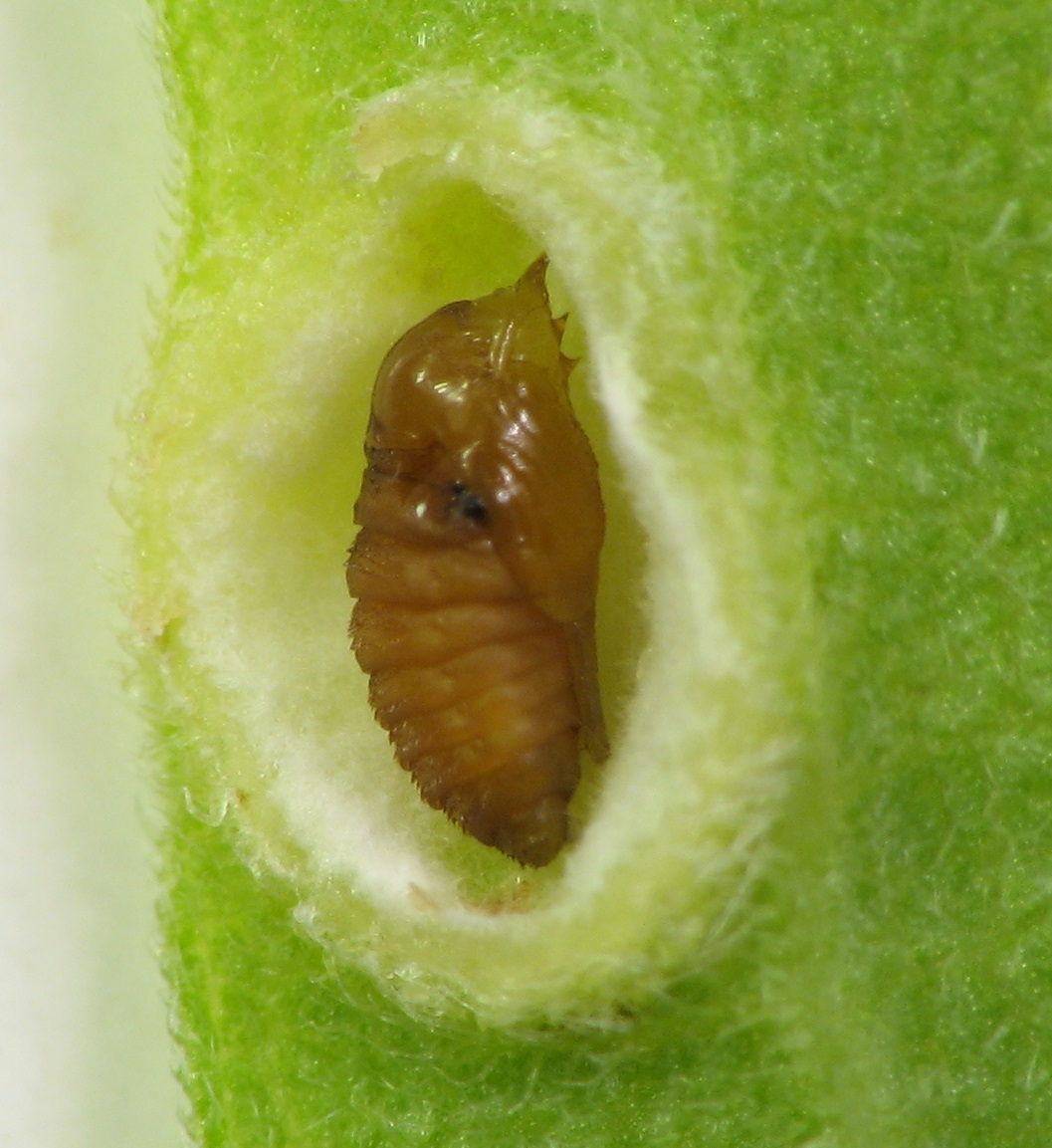
Asphondylia solidaginis pupa in its gall

Asphondylia is a cosmopolitan genus of gall midges in the family Cecidomyiidae. All species in this genus induce galls on plants, especially on flowers and flower buds. There are over 300 described species in the genus Asphondylia, with many more likely to be discovered and described, especially in the southern hemisphere.

Within the genus, characteristics of the larvae and pupae are often most useful for distinguishing between species since adults of most species look very similar to one another. The species inducing a given gall can sometimes be identified based on the shape and placement of the gall in combination with the identity of the host plant.

== Selected species ==
- Asphondylia abutilon Felt, 1935
- Asphondylia adenostoma Felt, 1916
- Asphondylia amaranthi Felt, 1935
- Asphondylia ambrosiae Gagne, 1975
- Asphondylia antennariae (Wheeler, 1889)
- Asphondylia artemisiae Felt, 1908
- Asphondylia atriplicicola (Cockerell, 1898)
- Asphondylia atriplicis (Townsend, 1893)
- Asphondylia auripila Felt, 1907
- Asphondylia autumnalis Beutenmuller, 1907
- Asphondylia azaleae Felt, 1907
- Asphondylia baroni Felt, 1908
- Asphondylia bea Felt, 1925
- Asphondylia betheli Cockerell, 1907
- Asphondylia bidens Johannsen, 1945
- Asphondylia bigeloviaebrassicoides (Townsend, 1893)
- Asphondylia boerhaaviae Mohn, 1959
- Asphondylia borrichiae Rossi & Strong, 1990
- Asphondylia brevicauda Felt, 1907
- Asphondylia buddleia (Felt, 1935)
- Asphondylia bumeliae Felt, 1907
- Asphondylia caudicis Gagne, 1986
- Asphondylia ceanothi Felt, 1908 (ceanothus bud gall midge)
- Asphondylia chrysothamni Felt, 1916
- Asphondylia clematidis Felt, 1935
- Asphondylia diervillae Felt, 1907
- Asphondylia diplaci Felt, 1912
- Asphondylia dondiae Felt, 1918
- Asphondylia enceliae Felt, 1912
- Asphondylia eupatorii Felt, 1911
- Asphondylia floccosa Gagne, 1968 (woolly stem gall midge)
- Asphondylia florida Felt, 1908
- Asphondylia foliata Gagne, 1986
- Asphondylia fulvopedalis Felt, 1907
- Asphondylia garryae Felt, 1912
- Asphondylia gemmae Gagne, 1968
- Asphondylia helianthiflorae Felt, 1908
- Asphondylia helianthiglobulus Osten Sacken, 1878
- Asphondylia hydrangeae Felt, 1907
- Asphondylia ilicicola Foote, 1953
- Asphondylia ilicoides Felt, 1907
- Asphondylia integrifoliae Felt, 1908
- Asphondylia johnsoni Felt, 1908
- Asphondylia lacinariae Felt, 1935
- Asphondylia mentzeliae Cockerell, 1900
- Asphondylia mimosae Felt, 1934
- Asphondylia monacha Osten Sacken, 1869
- Asphondylia nepetae Viggiani, 2018
- Asphondylia neomexicana (Cockerell, 1896)
- Asphondylia nodula Gagne, 1986
- Asphondylia photiniae Pritchard, 1952
- Asphondylia pilosa Kieffer, 1898
- Asphondylia portulacae Mohn, 1959
- Asphondylia prosopidis Cockerell, 1898 (mesquite gall midge)
- Asphondylia pseudorosa Dorchin, 2015
- Asphondylia ratibidae Felt, 1935
- Asphondylia recondita Osten Sacken, 1875
- Asphondylia resinosa Gagne, 1990 (creosote resin gall mige)
- Asphondylia rosulata Dorchin, 2015
- Asphondylia rudbeckiaeconspicua Osten Sacken, 1878
- Asphondylia salictaria Felt, 1907
- Asphondylia sambuci Felt, 1908
- Asphondylia sarothamni Loew, 1850
- Asphondylia shepherdiae Felt, 1916
- Asphondylia smilacinae Felt, 1907
- Asphondylia silva Dorchin, 2015
- Asphondylia solidaginis Beutenmüller, 1907
- Asphondylia thalictri Felt, 1911
- Asphondylia verbenae Felt, 1935
- Asphondylia vernoniae Felt, 1908
- Asphondylia websteri Felt, 1917 (alfalfa gall midge)
- Asphondylia xanthii Felt, 1936
