= Asphondylia betheli =

Scientific classification
- Kingdom: Animalia
- Phylum: Arthropoda
- Class: Insecta
- Order: Diptera
- Family: Cecidomyiidae
- Genus: Asphondylia
- Species: A. betheli

Binomial name
- Asphondylia betheli Cockerell, 1907

Synonyms
- Asphondylia arizonensis Felt, 1907; Asphondylia opuntiae Felt, 1908

Species of fly

Asphondylia betheli is a species of gall midge in the family Cecidomyiidae. This midge is widespread in the southwestern United States. The larvae of this species induce galls on in the fruit of Opuntia cacti.

This species was first described by American zoologist Theodore Cockerell in 1907.
