= Asphondylia sarothamni =

Scientific classification
- Kingdom: Animalia
- Phylum: Arthropoda
- Class: Insecta
- Order: Diptera
- Family: Cecidomyiidae
- Genus: Asphondylia
- Species: A. sarothamni

Binomial name
- Asphondylia sarothamni (Loew, 1850)

Synonyms
- Cecidomyia sarothamni Loew, 1850

Species of fly

Asphondylia sarothamni is a species of gall midge in the family Cecidomyiidae. The larva gall the leaf-buds and seed-pods of broom (Cytisus species).
