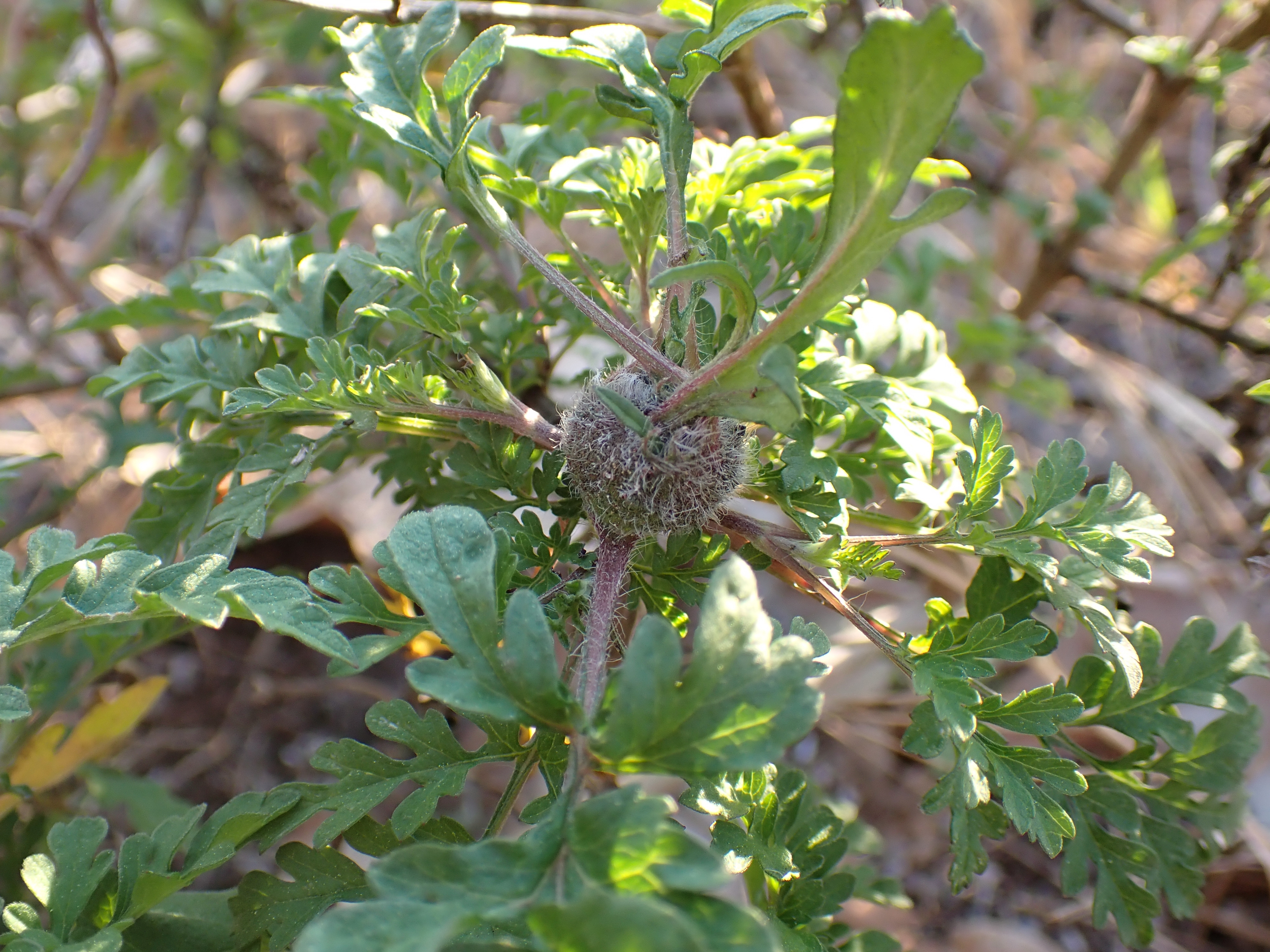
- Gall induced by Asphondylia ambrosiae on an Ambrosia artemisiifolia plant

Scientific classification
- Kingdom: Animalia
- Phylum: Arthropoda
- Clade: Pancrustacea
- Class: Insecta
- Order: Diptera
- Family: Cecidomyiidae
- Genus: Asphondylia
- Species: A. ambrosiae

Binomial name
- Asphondylia ambrosiae Gagné, 1975

= Asphondylia ambrosiae =

Species of fly

Asphondylia ambrosiae is a species of gall midge in the family Cecidomyiidae. The insects form fuzzy, globose bud galls on ragweed plants (Ambrosia spp.). The young pupate within the galls.
