= Asphondylia eupatorii =

Scientific classification
- Domain: Eukaryota
- Kingdom: Animalia
- Phylum: Arthropoda
- Class: Insecta
- Order: Diptera
- Family: Cecidomyiidae
- Genus: Asphondylia
- Species: A. eupatorii

Binomial name
- Asphondylia eupatorii Felt, 1911

Species of fly

Asphondylia eupatorii is a species of gall midge in the family Cecidomyiidae. Ageratina altissima is one of its host plants.
