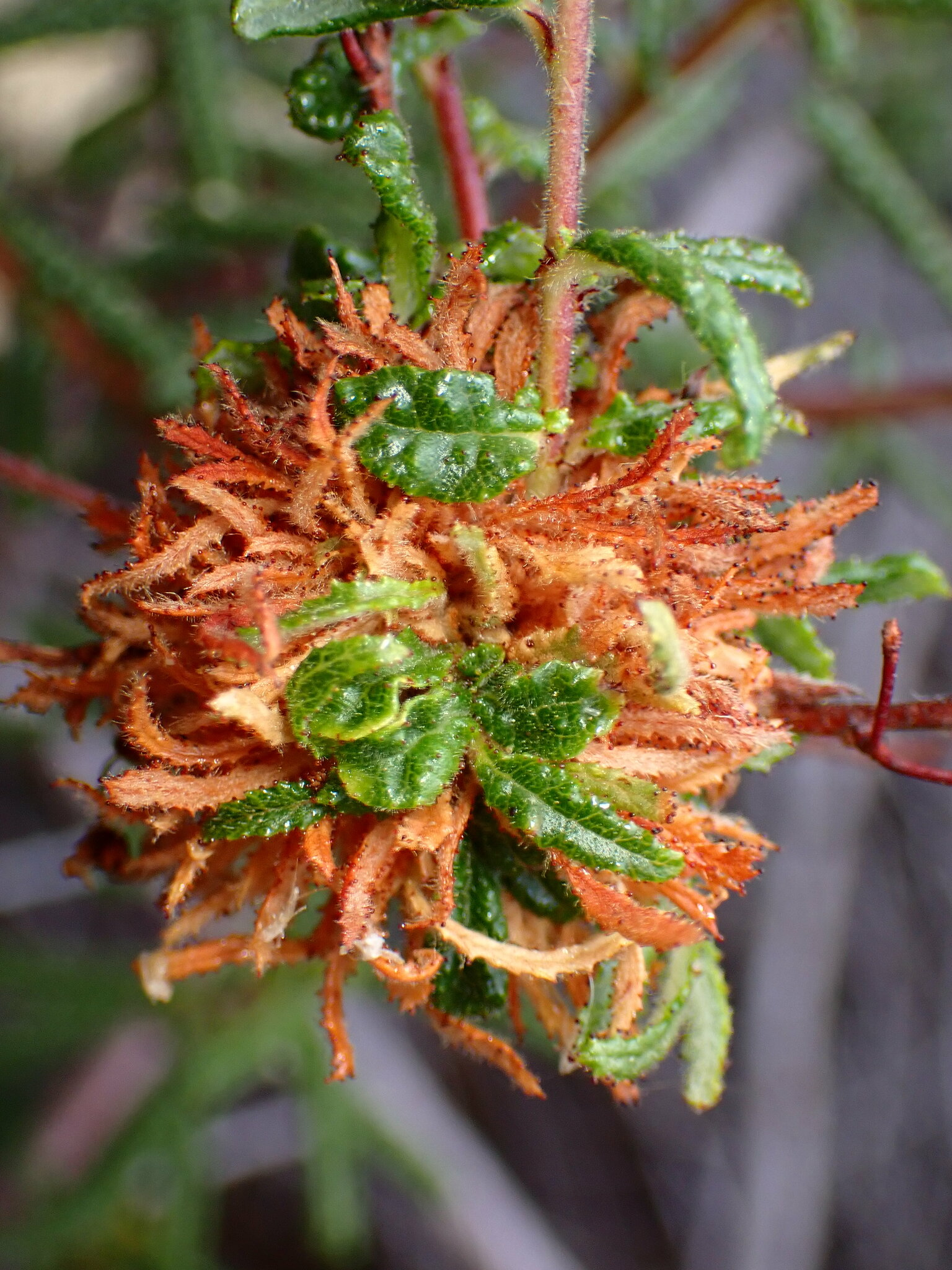
- Santa Cruz County, California, 2022

Scientific classification
- Kingdom: Animalia
- Phylum: Arthropoda
- Class: Insecta
- Order: Diptera
- Family: Cecidomyiidae
- Genus: Asphondylia
- Species: A. ceanothi

Binomial name
- Asphondylia ceanothi Felt, 1908

= Asphondylia ceanothi =

Species of fly

Asphondylia ceanothi, the ceanothus bud gall midge, is a species of gall midges in the family Cecidomyiidae.
