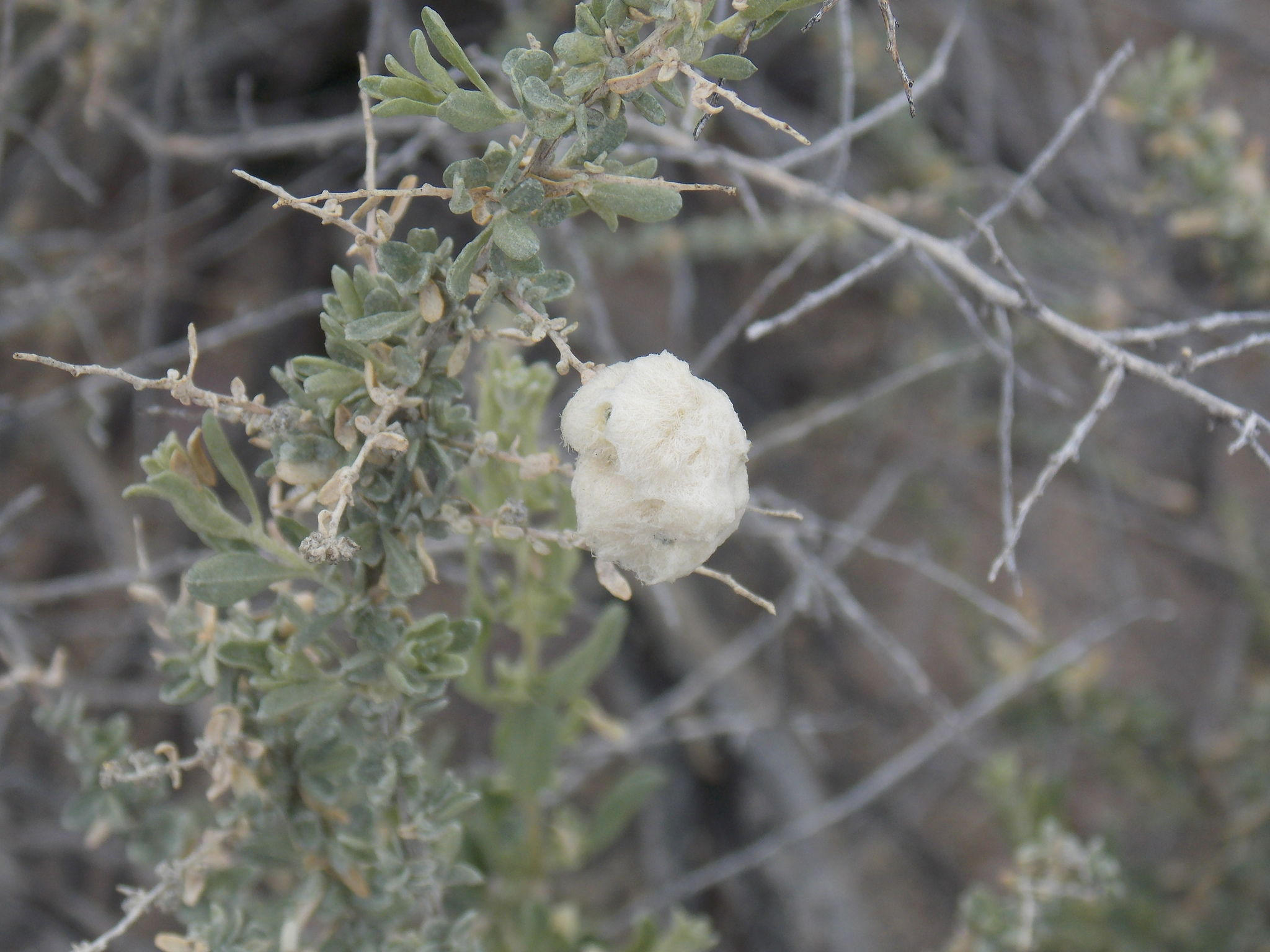
- Asphondylia floccosa gall

Scientific classification
- Kingdom: Animalia
- Phylum: Arthropoda
- Class: Insecta
- Order: Diptera
- Family: Cecidomyiidae
- Genus: Asphondylia
- Species: A. floccosa

Binomial name
- Asphondylia floccosa Gagne, 1968

= Asphondylia floccosa =

Species of fly

Asphondylia floccosa, the woolly stem gall midge, is a species of gall midges in the family Cecidomyiidae. The larvae induce galls on Atriplex polycarpa. They don't feed on the gall itself, but rather fungus that grows within the gall. Each gall can contain anywhere from one to fifteen chambers. This species is known from Arizona and California, and was first described by American entomologist Raymond Gagne in 1968.
