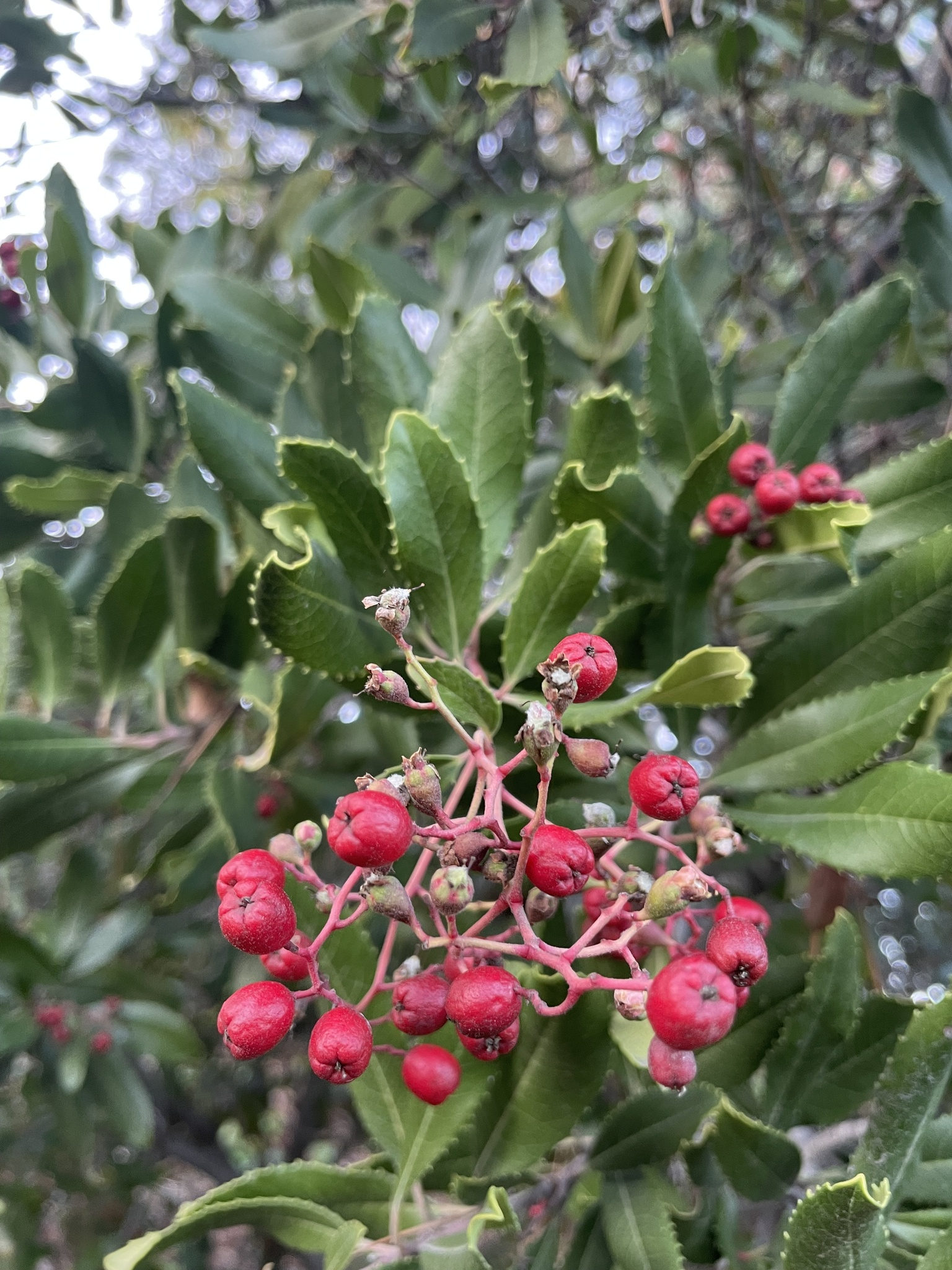
- Campbell, California, 2022

Scientific classification
- Domain: Eukaryota
- Kingdom: Animalia
- Phylum: Arthropoda
- Class: Insecta
- Order: Diptera
- Family: Cecidomyiidae
- Genus: Asphondylia
- Species: A. photiniae

Binomial name
- Asphondylia photiniae (Pritchard, 1953)

= Asphondylia photiniae =

North American-inducing insect

Asphondylia photiniae, also known as the toyon fruit gall midge or toyon berry gall midge, is a species of midge that induces galls on the developing berries of the toyon bush in North America. Galled berries stay green (when other fruit has ripened to red or gold, etc.) and look somewhat warped. Each galled berry contains a single larva, which emerges in spring. This midge is known from the Californias, where native Heteromeles arbutifolia grows in relative abundance.
