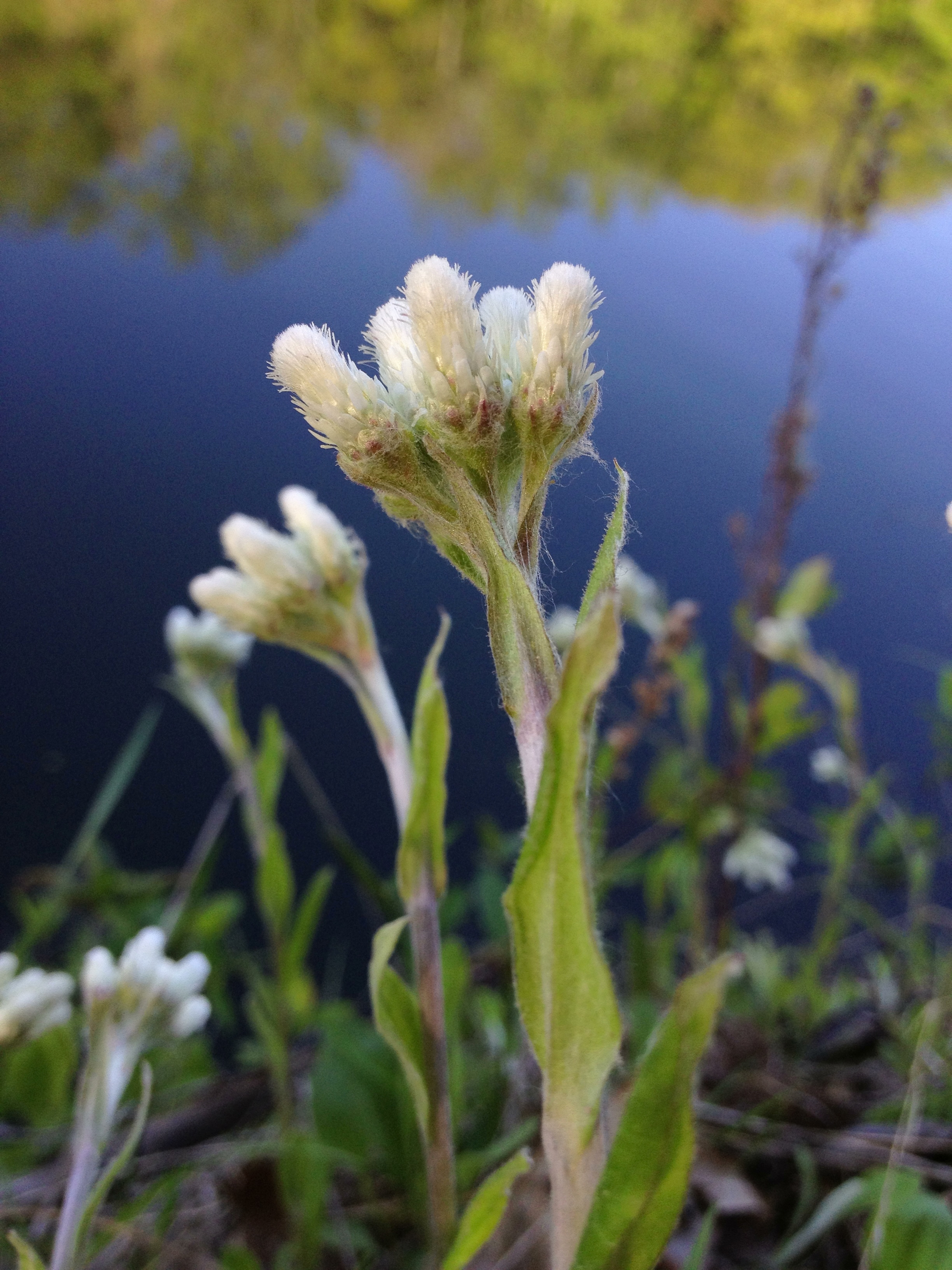
- Female (pistillate) flower

Conservation status
- Secure (NatureServe)

Scientific classification
- Kingdom: Plantae
- Clade: Tracheophytes
- Clade: Angiosperms
- Clade: Eudicots
- Clade: Asterids
- Order: Asterales
- Family: Asteraceae
- Genus: Antennaria
- Species: A. plantaginifolia

Binomial name
- Antennaria plantaginifolia (L.) Richardson

Synonyms
- Antennaria caroliniana Rydb. ex Small; Antennaria decipiens Greene; Antennaria denikeana B.Boivin; Antennaria nemoralis Greene; Antennaria petiolata Fernald; Antennaria pinetorum Greene; Antennaria plantaginea (L.) DC. Disynanthus plantagineus (L.) Raf. Gnaphalium disynanthus Raf. Gnaphalium monocephalum Carp ex Torr. & A.Gray; Gnaphalium plantaginifolium L.

= Antennaria plantaginifolia =

Species of flowering plant

Antennaria plantaginifolia (known by the common names plantain leaf pussytoes and woman's tobacco) is a perennial forb native to the eastern North America, that produces cream colored composite flowers in spring.

== Description ==
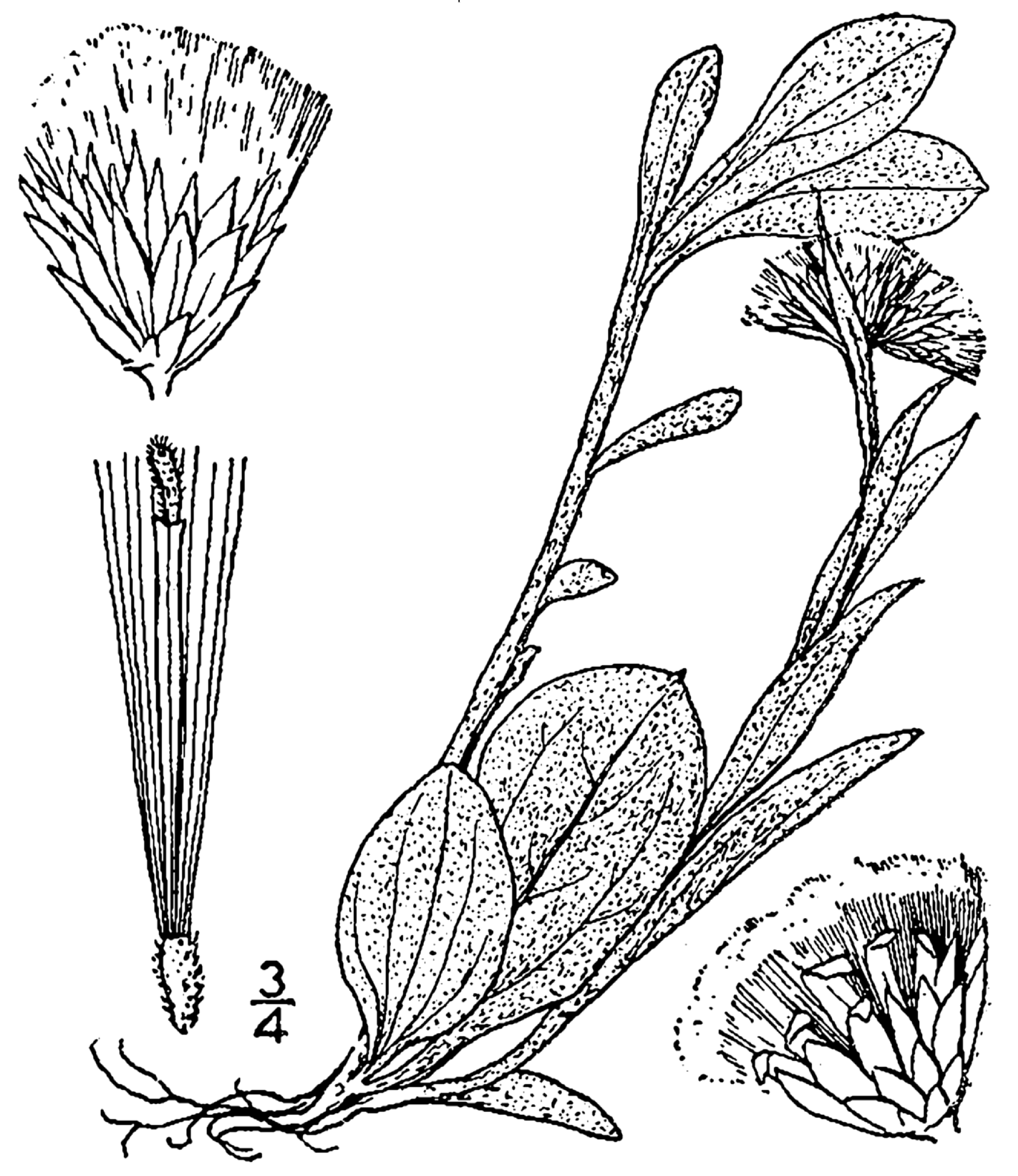
Botanical illustration of Antennaria plantaginifolia (1913)

Antennaria plantaginifolia is rarely more than 15 centimeters (5.9 in) tall, consisting of a basal rosette, and an erect stem which bears the inflorescence, a tight flat topped cluster of 4 to 17 fuzzy flower heads composed exclusively of disc flowers, with no ray flowers. The basal leaves are petiolate, oval to roundish, 3.5 to 7.5 centimeters (1.4 to 3.0 in) long and 1.5 to 3.5 centimeters (0.6 to 1.4 in) wide, with 3 to 7 prominent veins. The under side of the leaves is covered in thick silvery hair. Additional leaves along the stem are lanceolate and smaller. The fruit are cypselae with a pappus of white bristles.

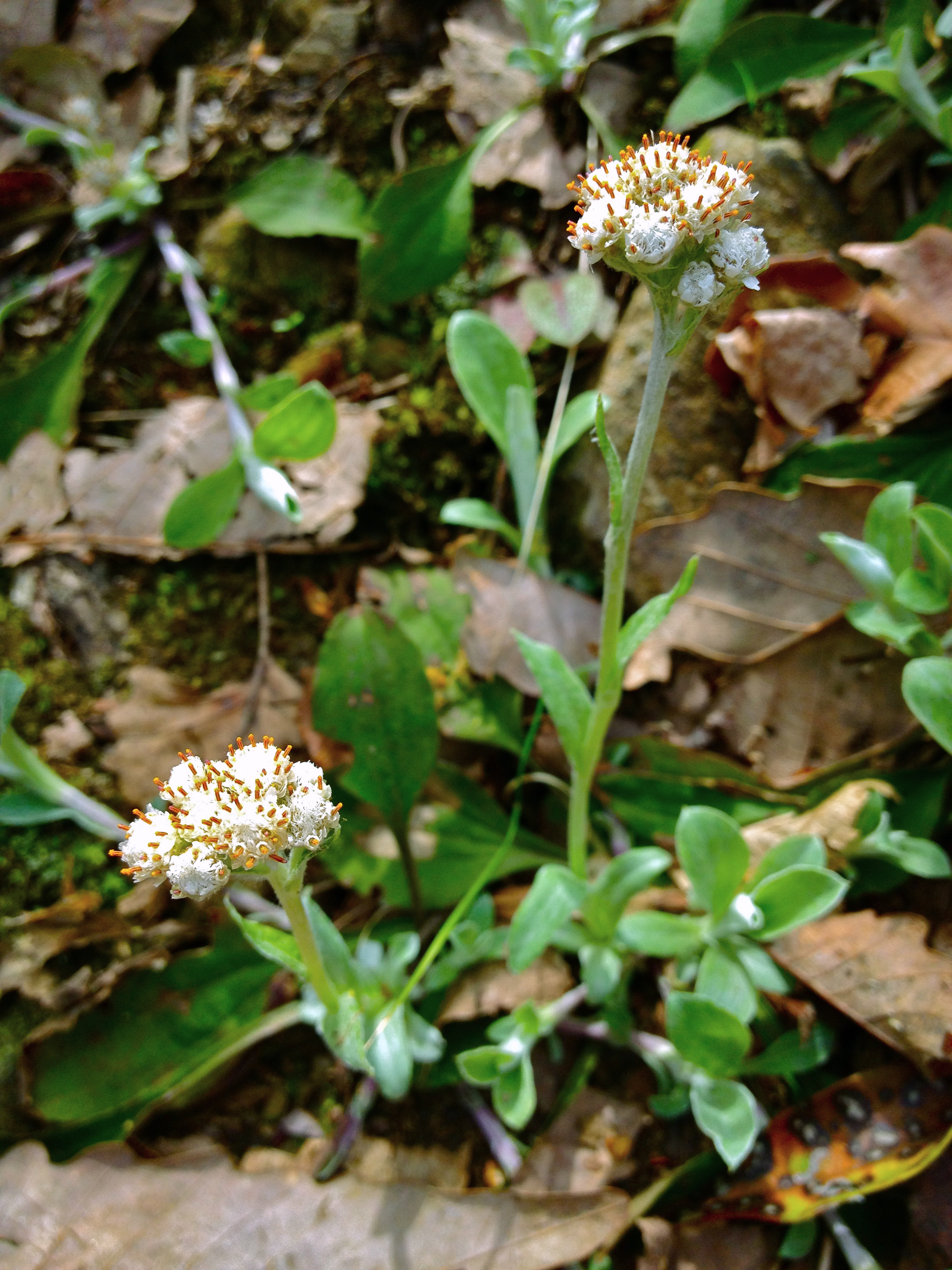
Male (staminate) flower

Antennaria plantaginifolia is dioecious, meaning that the male and female flowers are borne on separate plants. It often forms colonies, sometimes consisting entirely of male or female plants. It does so in part through vegetative reproduction. Stolons emerging from the basal rosette take root and develop into new plants.

== Distribution and habitat ==
Antennaria plantaginifolia is widely distributed in the eastern North America from Quebec and Nova Scotia west to Minnesota and south to Mississippi, Arkansas, and Florida, with isolated populations in eastern Texas and Saskatchewan. In Virginia, it grows in habitats including dry forests, barrens, and meadows. The presence of this species is dependent on appropriate habitat, and it may be eliminated from an area by development, changes in land use, or competition with invasive species.

In North America, the plant was nominally called "Indian tobacco", as it was often chewed by children in place of real tobacco.

=== Galls ===
This species is host to the following insect induced gall:

- Asynapta antennariae Wheeler, 1889 (see image)

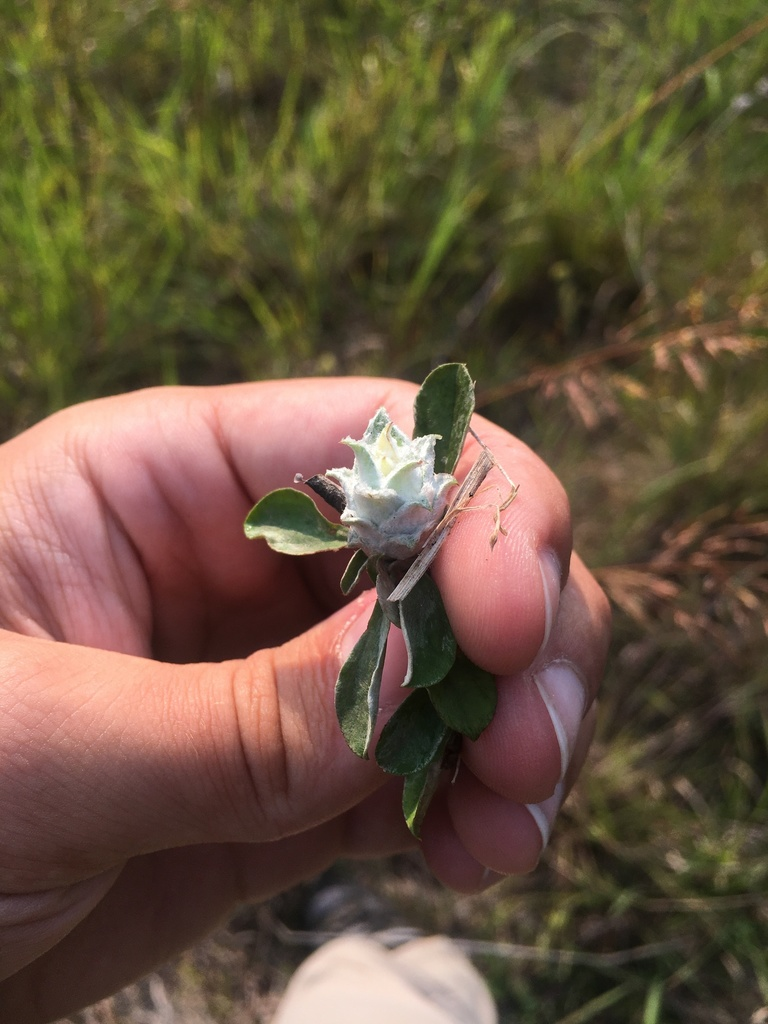
Asynapta antennariae gall

external link to gallformers
