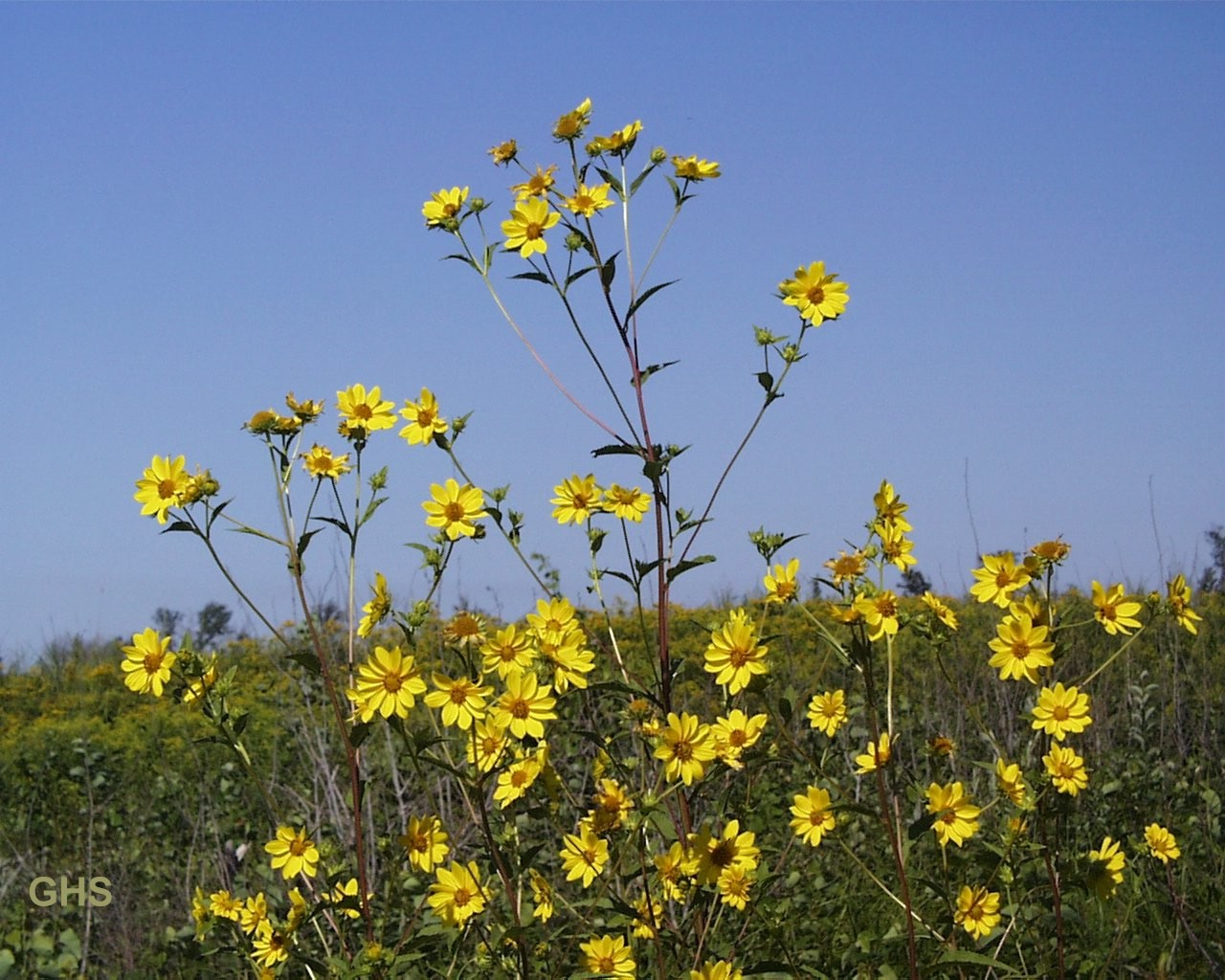

Conservation status
- Least Concern (IUCN 3.1)

Scientific classification
- Kingdom: Plantae
- Clade: Tracheophytes
- Clade: Angiosperms
- Clade: Eudicots
- Clade: Asterids
- Order: Asterales
- Family: Asteraceae
- Tribe: Heliantheae
- Genus: Helianthus
- Species: H. giganteus

Binomial name
- Helianthus giganteus L.

Synonyms
- Helianthus alienus E.Watson; Helianthus borealis E.Watson; Helianthus subtuberosus (Britton) Britton; Helianthus validus E.Watson

= Helianthus giganteus =

Species of sunflower

Helianthus giganteus, the giant sunflower or tall sunflower, is a species of Helianthus native to the eastern United States and eastern and central Canada, from Newfoundland west to Alberta south to Minnesota, Mississippi, and South Carolina.

== Description ==
Helianthus giganteus is a perennial herbaceous plant native to the northern United States and southern Canada that can grow up to 1–3 metres (3.3–9.8 ft) tall with instances to 4m (13 feet). The leaves are approximately 1 inch wide by 7 inches long, and partly rough. The flower heads are bright yellow, up to 7 cm (3 in) in diameter. They are most commonly found in valleys with wet meadows or swamps and even near river banks.

== Characteristics ==
The stalk is purple to red with spreading white hairs on it. The leaves are lancolate and alternate. This perennial sunflower has a fibrous root system and spreads by seed and rhizomes. These rhizomes will form a large clump.

== Cultivation and use ==
The Choctaw Indians of the southeastern United States have traditionally cultivated the Helianthus giganteus and made a palatable bread by mixing the ground sunflower seed with that of ground maize.
