= Asphondylia monacha =

Scientific classification
- Kingdom: Animalia
- Phylum: Arthropoda
- Clade: Pancrustacea
- Class: Insecta
- Order: Diptera
- Family: Cecidomyiidae
- Genus: Asphondylia
- Species: A. monacha

Binomial name
- Asphondylia monacha Osten Sacken, 1869

Species of fly

Asphondylia monacha is a species of gall midges in the family Cecidomyiidae.
