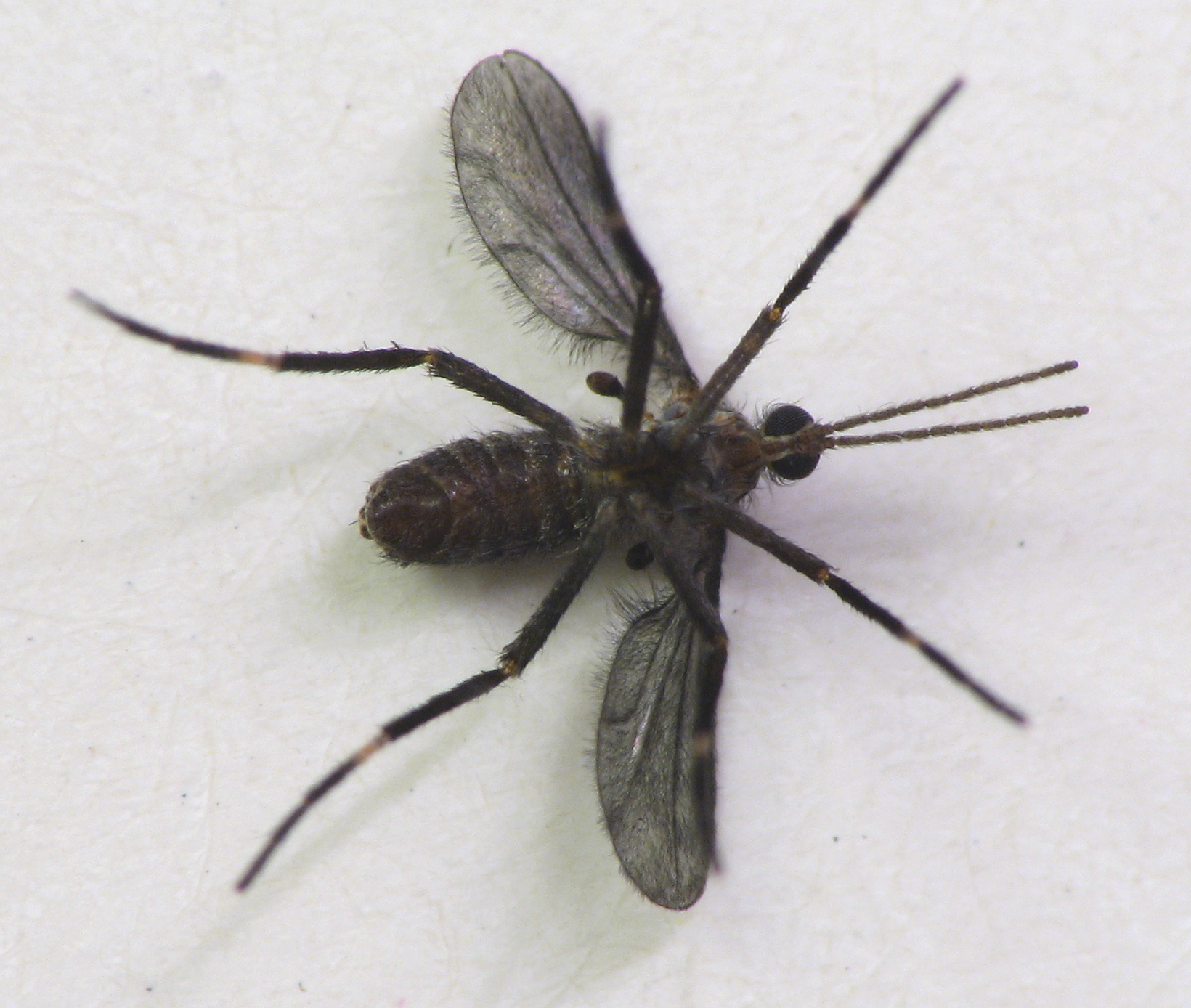
- Asphondylia solidaginis

Scientific classification
- Kingdom: Animalia
- Phylum: Arthropoda
- Clade: Pancrustacea
- Class: Insecta
- Order: Diptera
- Family: Cecidomyiidae
- Subfamily: Cecidomyiinae
- Supertribe: Asphondyliidi
- Tribe: Asphondyliini

= Asphondyliini =

Tribe of flies

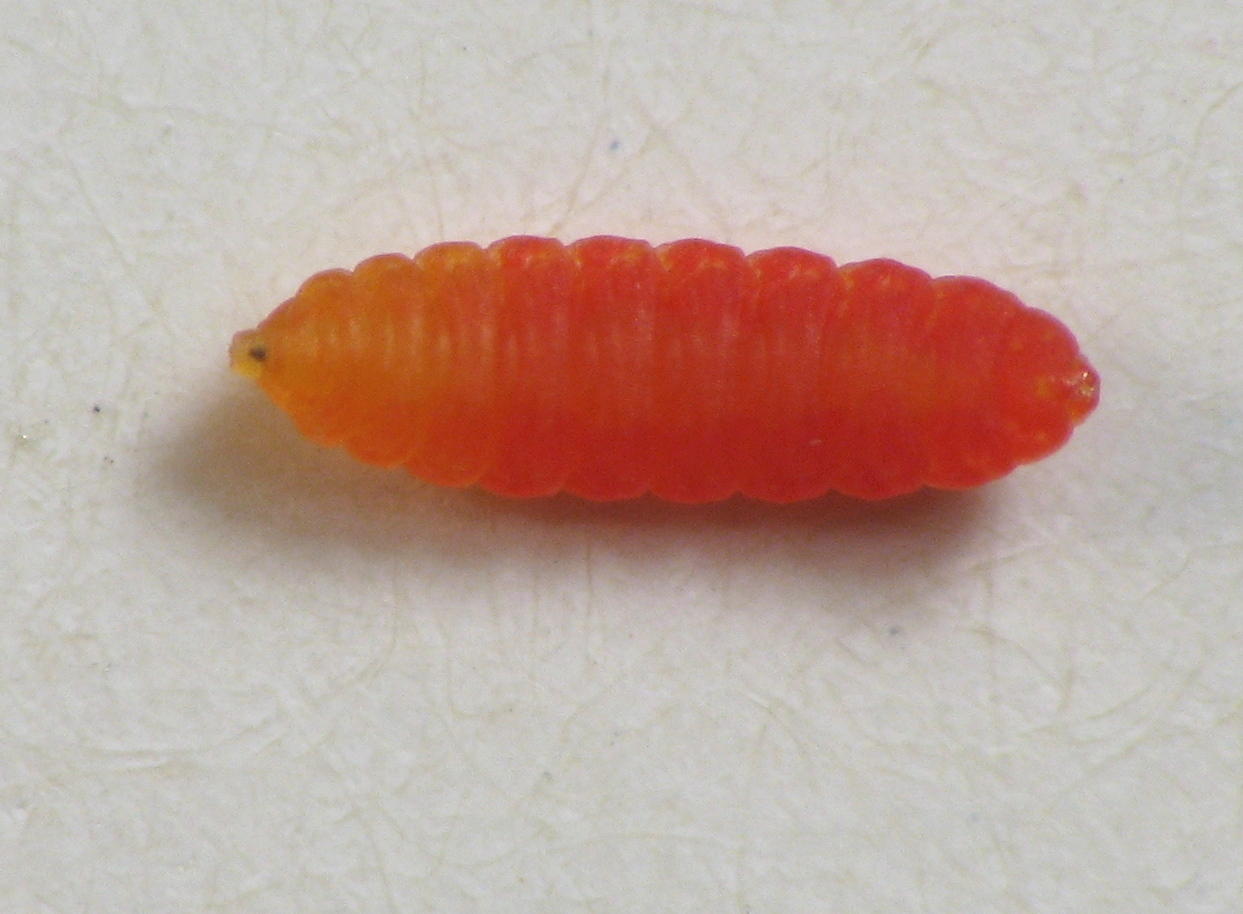
Schizomyia racemicola larva

Asphondyliini is a tribe of gall midges in the family Cecidomyiidae. There are about six genera and at least 100 described species in Asphondyliini.

== Genera ==
- Ampelomyia
- Asphondylia
- Bruggmannia
- Bruggmanniella
- Daphnephila Kieffer, 1905
- Kiefferia Mik, 1895
- Polystepha Kieffer, 1897
- Schizomyia
- Stephomyia
