= Greasewood =

Greasewood is a common name shared by several plants:

- Adenostoma fasciculatum is a plant with white flowers that is native to Oregon, Nevada, California, and northern Baja California. This shrub is one of the most widespread plants of the chaparral biome.
- Baccharis sarothroides is a shrub with tiny green blooms native to the Sonoran Desert of northern Mexico and the southwestern United States, commonly found in gravelly dry soils and disturbed areas.
- Glossopetalon spinescens is a species of shrub known by the common names spiny greasewood and Nevada greasewood. The shrub is native to the western United States and northern Mexico, where it grows in mountainous habitats, often on limestone substrates. It has small white-petalled flowers in the leaf axils.
- Gutierrezia, generally called snakeweeds or matchweeds, annual, perennial, or shrub-like plants with white or yellow flowers, of western North America and western South America.
- Larrea tridentata is a prominent species in the Mojave, Sonoran, and Chihuahuan Deserts. Its flowers are up to 25 millimetres (0.98 in) in diameter, with five yellow petals.
- Sarcobatus vermiculatus is a green-leaved shrub found from southeastern British Columbia and southwest Alberta, Canada south through the drier regions of the United States (east to North Dakota and west Texas, west to eastern Washington and eastern California) to northern Mexico (Coahuila). It is a halophyte, usually found in sunny, flat areas around the margins of playas.
Plants called greasewood

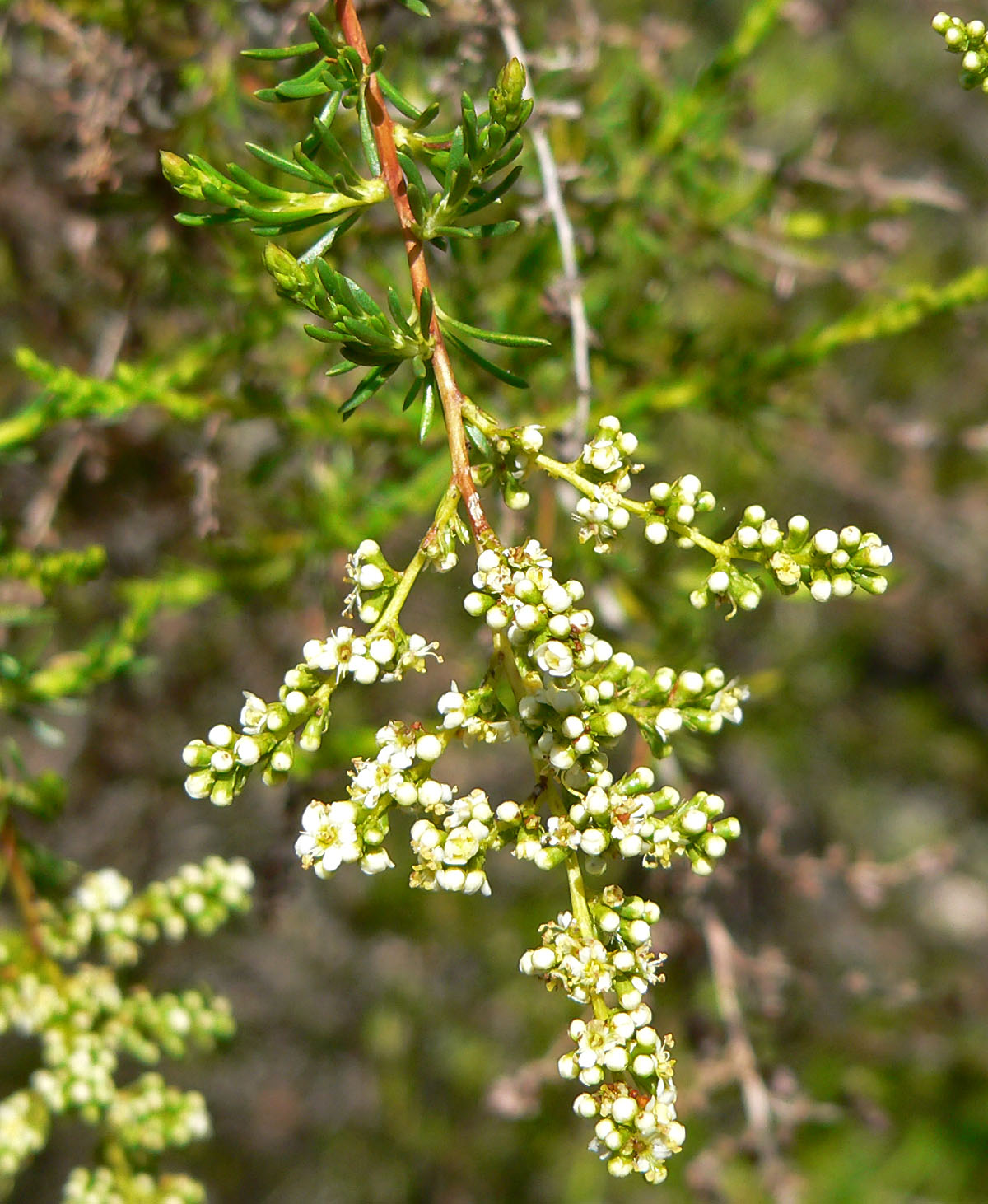
Flowers of Adenostoma fasciculatum

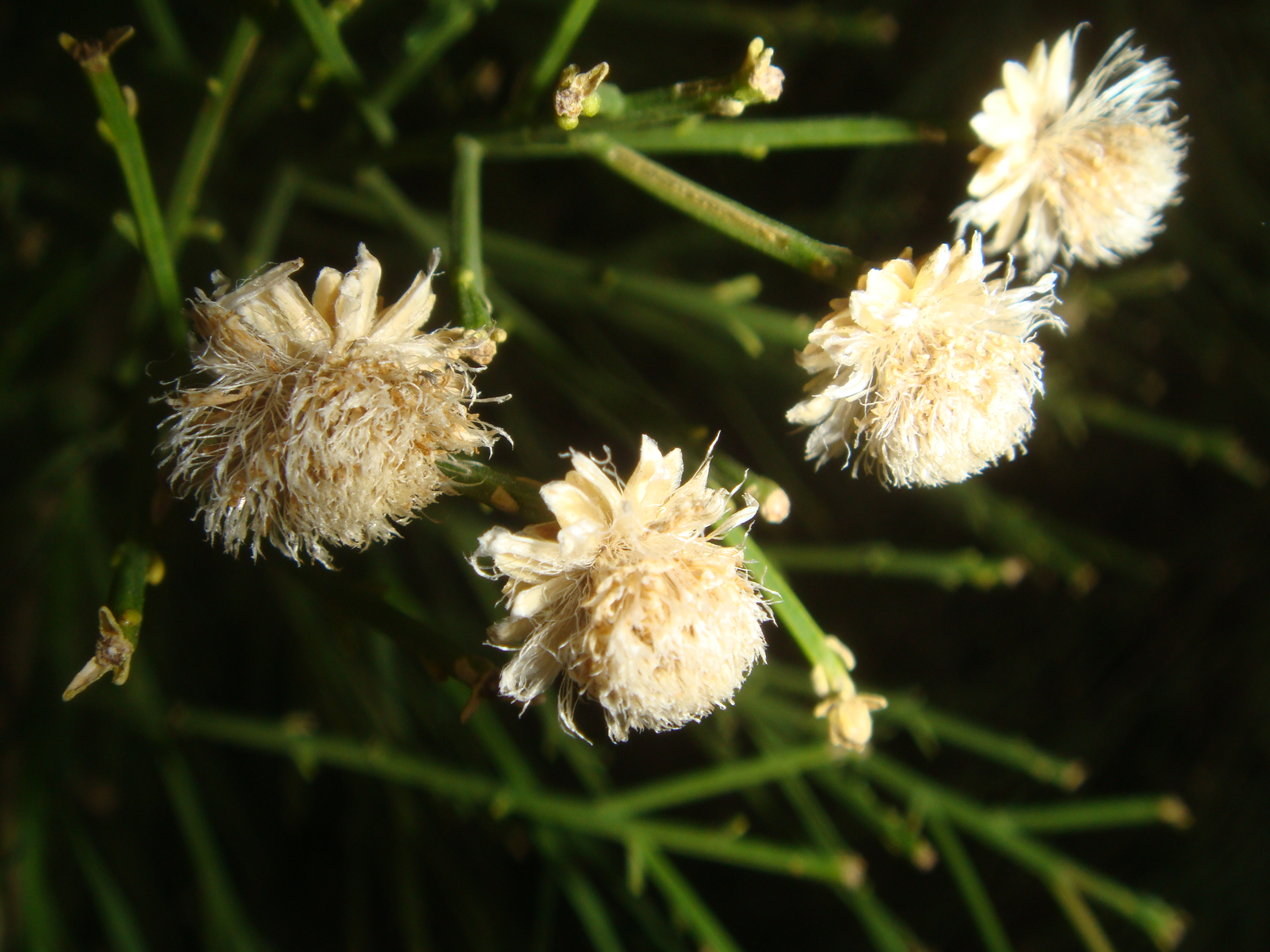
Close up of dried flowers of Baccharis sarothroides

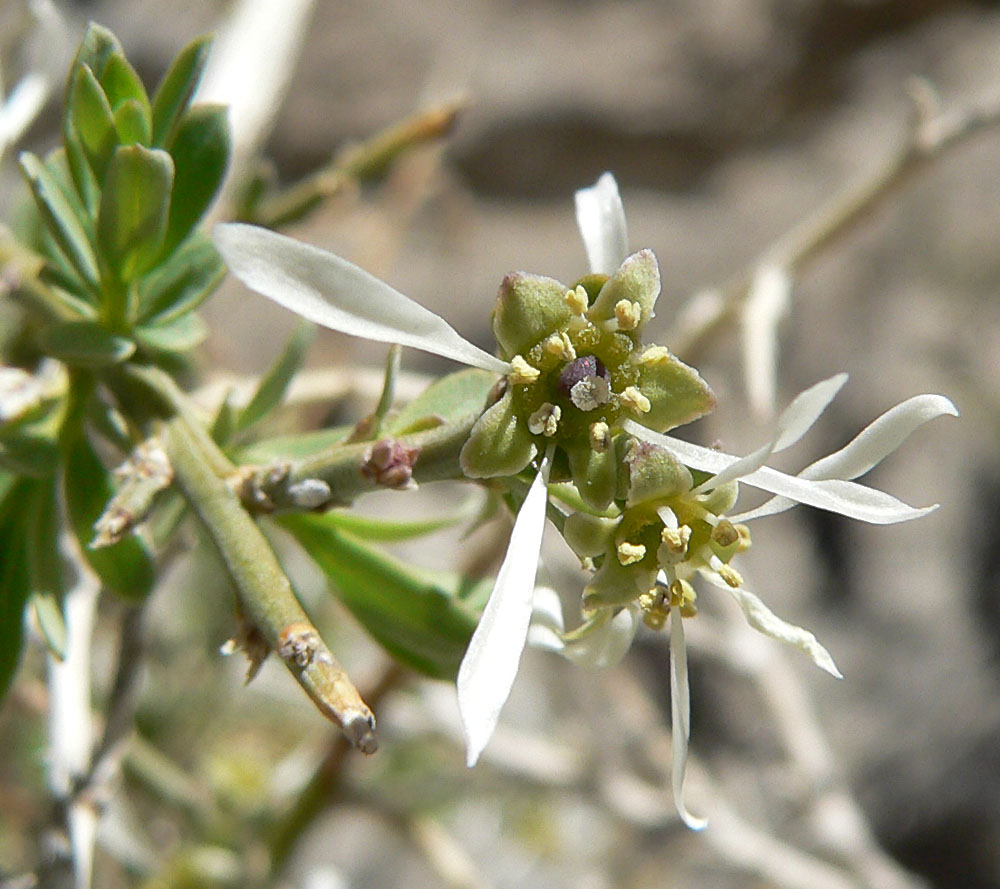
Flowers of Glossopetalon spinescens

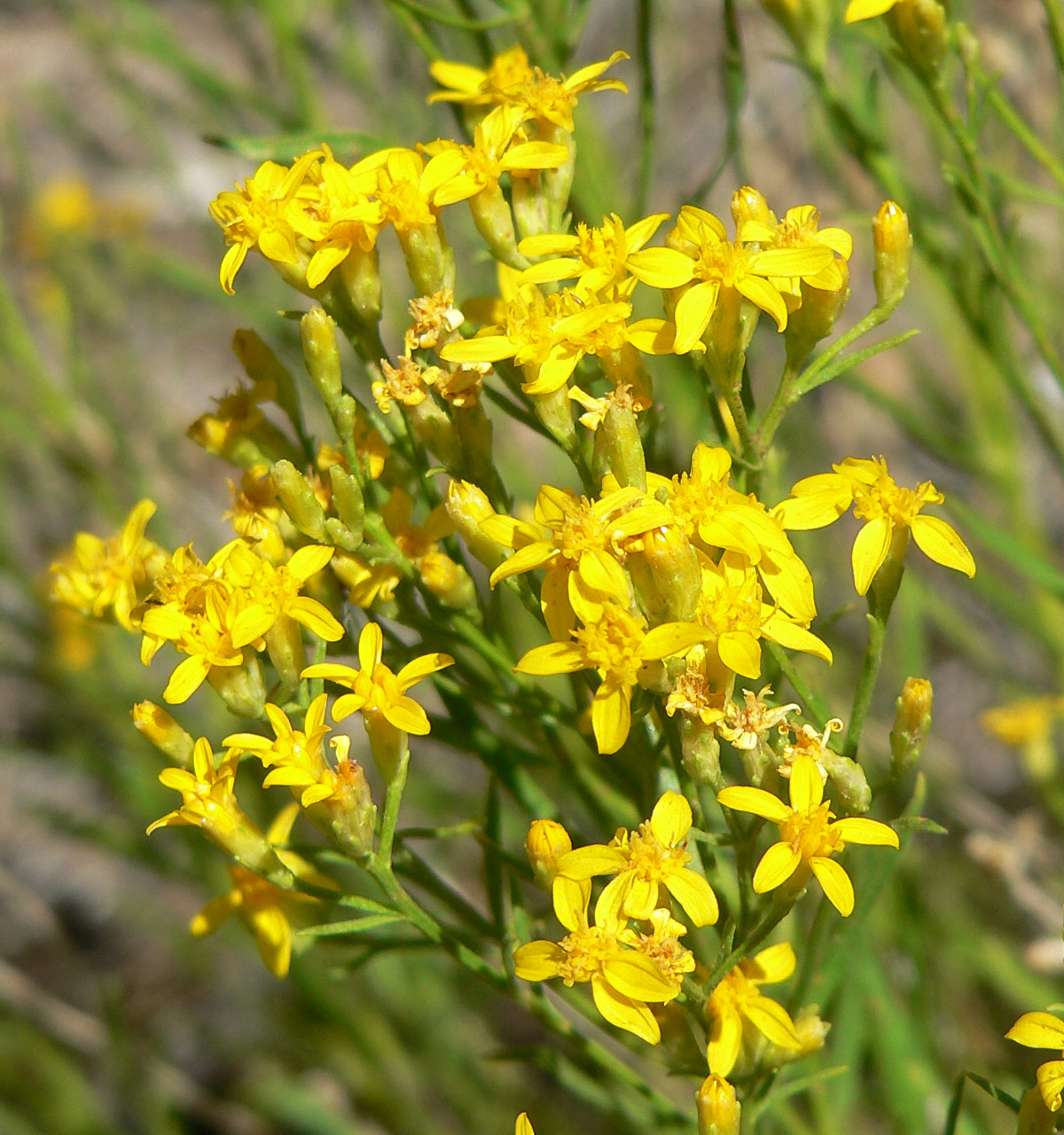
Flowers of Gutierrezia sarothrae

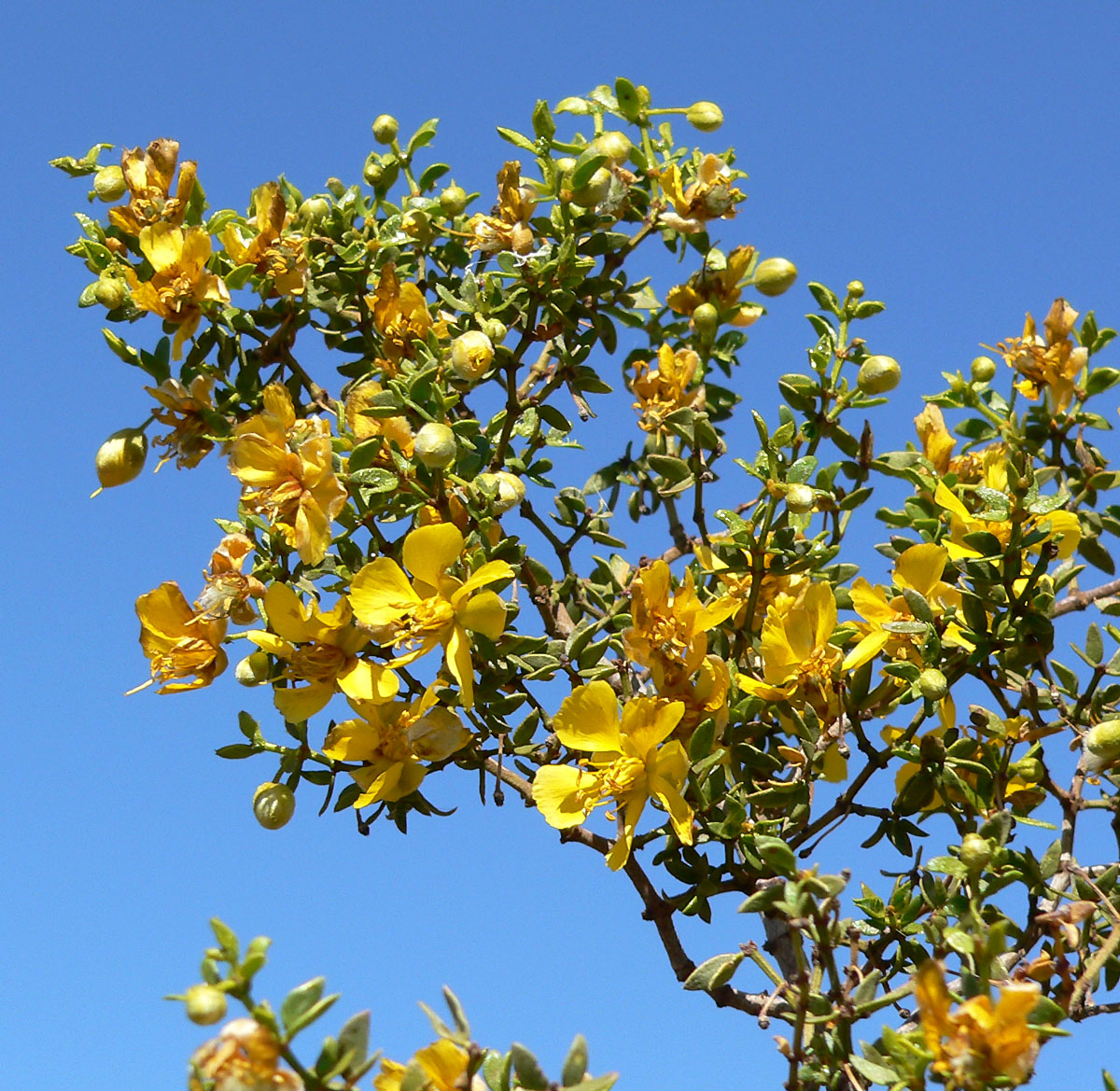
Flowers of Larrea tridentata

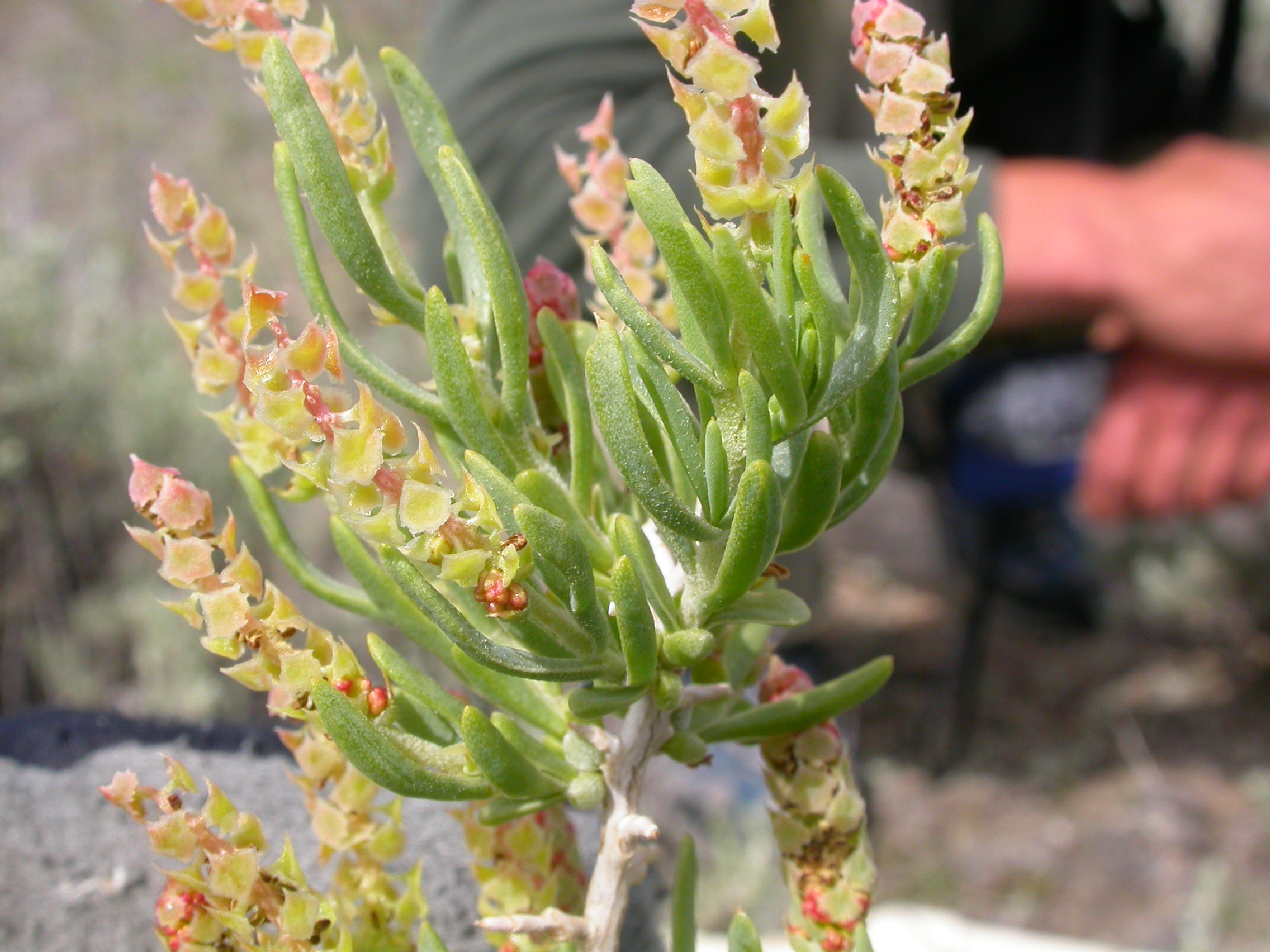
Cone-like structures containing the female flowers of Sarcobatus vermiculatus
