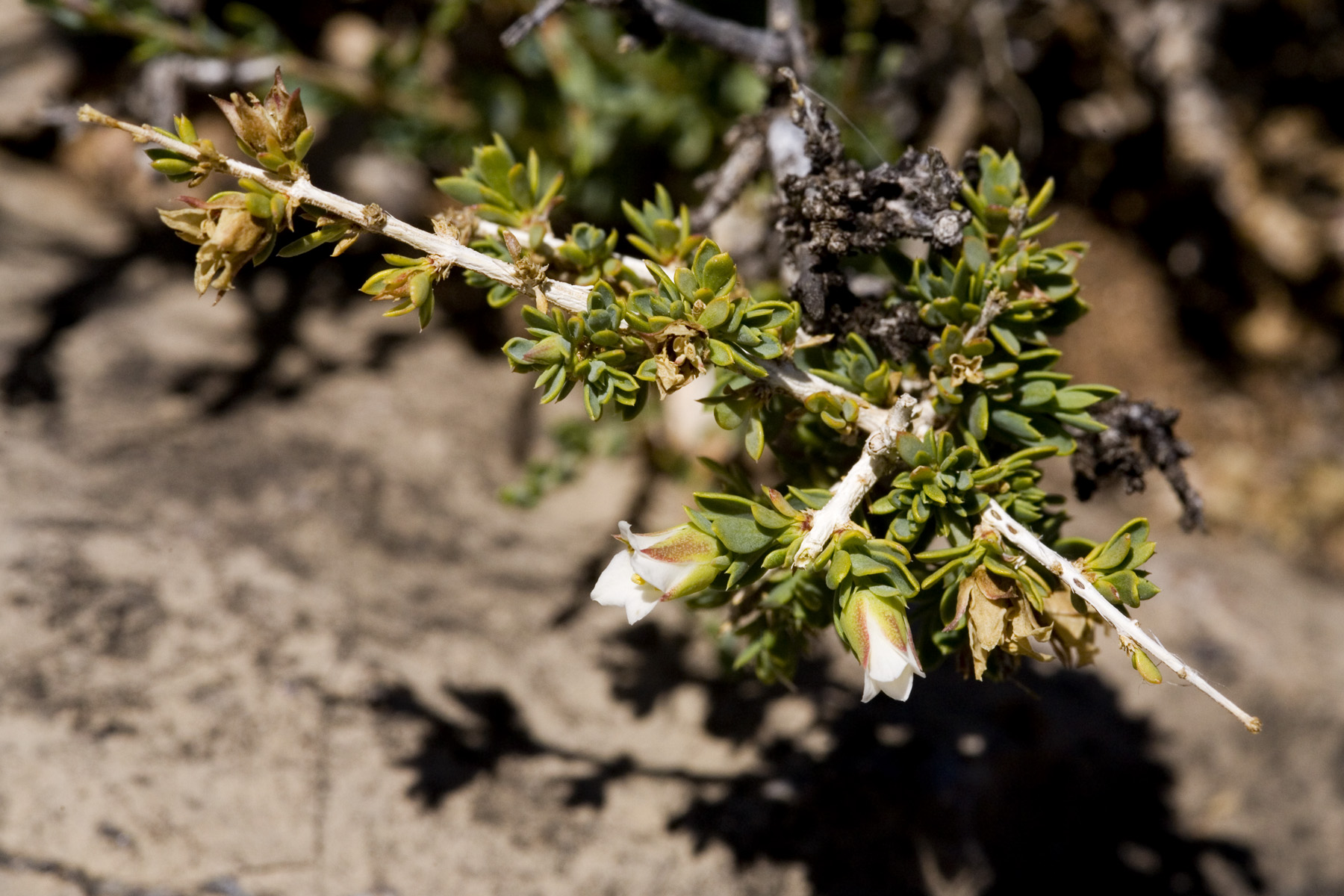

Conservation status
- Imperiled (NatureServe)

Scientific classification
- Kingdom: Plantae
- Clade: Tracheophytes
- Clade: Angiosperms
- Clade: Eudicots
- Clade: Rosids
- Order: Crossosomatales
- Family: Crossosomataceae
- Genus: Apacheria; C.T.Mason
- Species: A. chiricahuensis

Binomial name
- Apacheria chiricahuensis C.T.Mason

= Apacheria chiricahuensis =

Species of flowering plant

Apacheria chiricahuensis is a species of flowering plant in the family Crossosomataceae. It is the only species in the monotypic genus Apacheria. It is known by the common names Chiricahua rock flower, cliff brittlebush, and Apache bush. The genus is named in honor of the Apache people who inhabit the region; the specific epithet refers to the Chiricahua Mountains in Cochise County, Arizona.

This plant is a shrub up to half a meter tall and one meter wide. The hard, spine-like twigs are lined with opposite clusters of leaves each a few millimeters long. The solitary flowers have four white to cream-colored, or occasionally pink, petals 5 to 6 millimeters long. The fruit is a follicle with 1 or 2 brown seeds.

Apacheria is similar to Crossosoma species, which can be differentiated by their alternate leaves and five-parted flowers.

This plant grows in many types of rocky desert habitat, such as cliffs, riparian woodlands, and chaparral.
