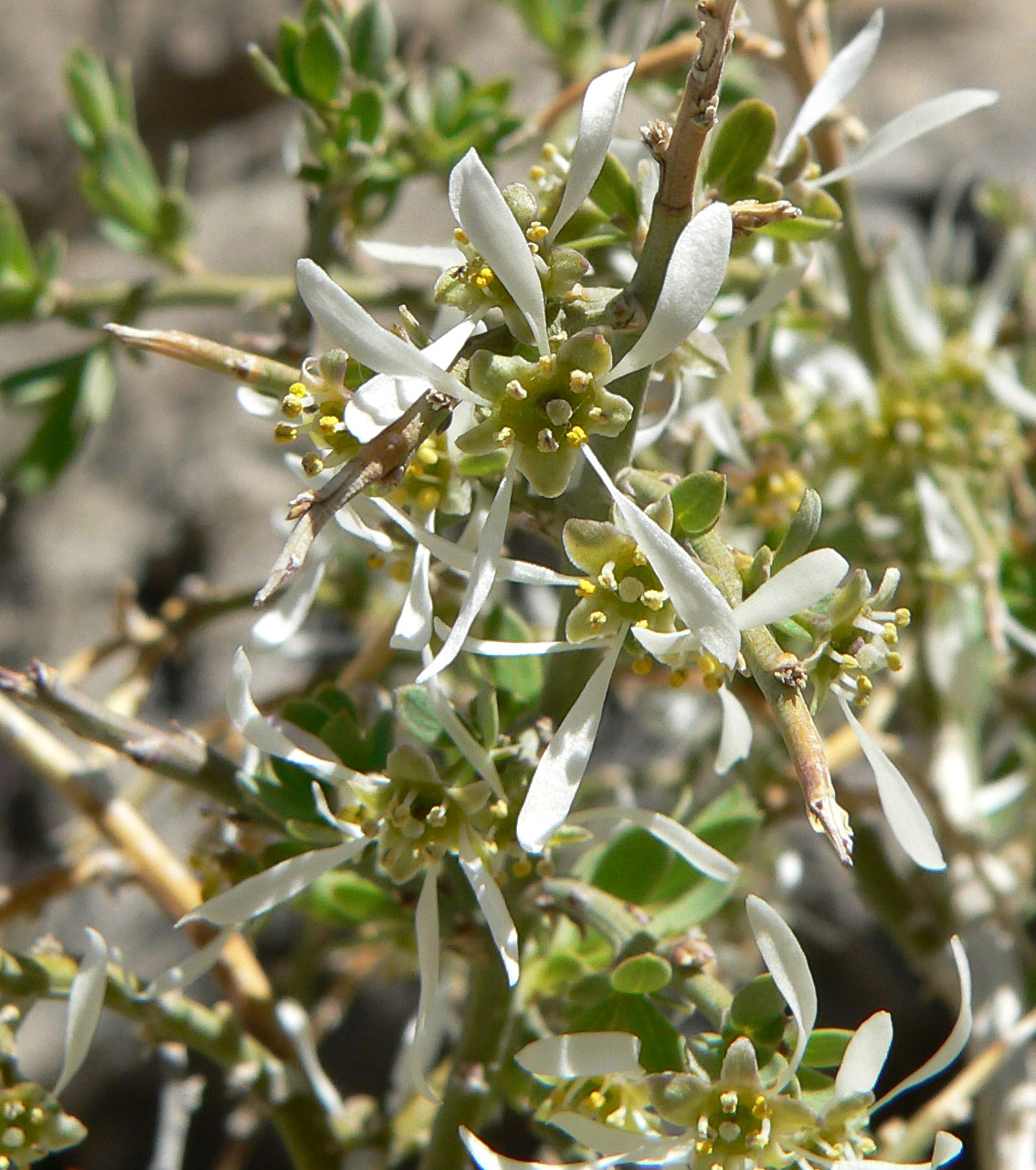
- Glossopetalon spinescens var. aridum Spring Mountains, southern Nevada

Conservation status
- Secure (NatureServe)

Scientific classification
- Kingdom: Plantae
- Clade: Tracheophytes
- Clade: Angiosperms
- Clade: Eudicots
- Clade: Rosids
- Order: Crossosomatales
- Family: Crossosomataceae
- Genus: Glossopetalon
- Species: G. spinescens

Binomial name
- Glossopetalon spinescens A.Gray

Varieties
- Glossopetalon spinescens var. aridum M.E.Jones; Glossopetalon spinescens var. clokeyi (Ensign) M.L.Allen; Glossopetalon spinescens var. goodwinii M.L.Allen; Glossopetalon spinescens var. meionandrum (Koehne) Trel.; Glossopetalon spinescens var. mexicanum (Ensign) H.St.John; Glossopetalon spinescens var. microphyllum N.H.Holmgren; Glossopetalon spinescens var. planitierum (Ensign) Yatsk.; Glossopetalon spinescens var. spinescens; Glossopetalon spinescens var. texense (Ensign) M.L.Allen

Synonyms
- List: Forsellesia arida (M.E.Jones) A.Heller (1900); Forsellesia clokeyi Ensign (1942); Forsellesia meionandra (Koehne) A.Heller (1900); Forsellesia nevadensis (A.Gray) Greene (1893); Forsellesia planitierum Ensign (1942); Forsellesia spinescens var. typica Ensign (1942); Forsellesia spinescens (A.Gray) Greene (1893); Forsellesia stipulifera (H.St.John) Ensign (1942); Forsellesia texensis Ensign (1942); Glossopetalon clokeyi (Ensign) H.St.John (1942); Glossopetalon meionandrum Koehne (1894); Glossopetalon nevadense A.Gray (1876); Glossopetalon planitierum (Ensign) H.St.John (1942); Glossopetalon spinescens var. typicum (Ensign) H.St.John (1942); Glossopetalon stipuliferum H.St.John (1937); Glossopetalon texense (Ensign) H.St.John (1942)

= Glossopetalon spinescens =

Western North American species of greasebush

Glossopetalon spinescens, syn. Forsellesia spinescens, is a species of flowering shrub in the family Crossosomataceae known by the common names greasebush, spiny greasebush, Nevada greasewood and spring greasebush.

It is native to Mexico and the western United States, where it grows in mountainous habitats, often on limestone substrates.

== Common names ==
Glossopetalon spinescens known by the common names greasebush, spiny greasebush, Nevada greasewood (in California), spring greasebush and spiny greasewood, depending on location/source.

The name 'greasewood' is also a common name for Larrea tridentata in Texas.

The different varieties of this species have also been given separate common names when they were still regarded as distinct species, i.e. plains greasebush for G. planitierum, etc.

== Description ==
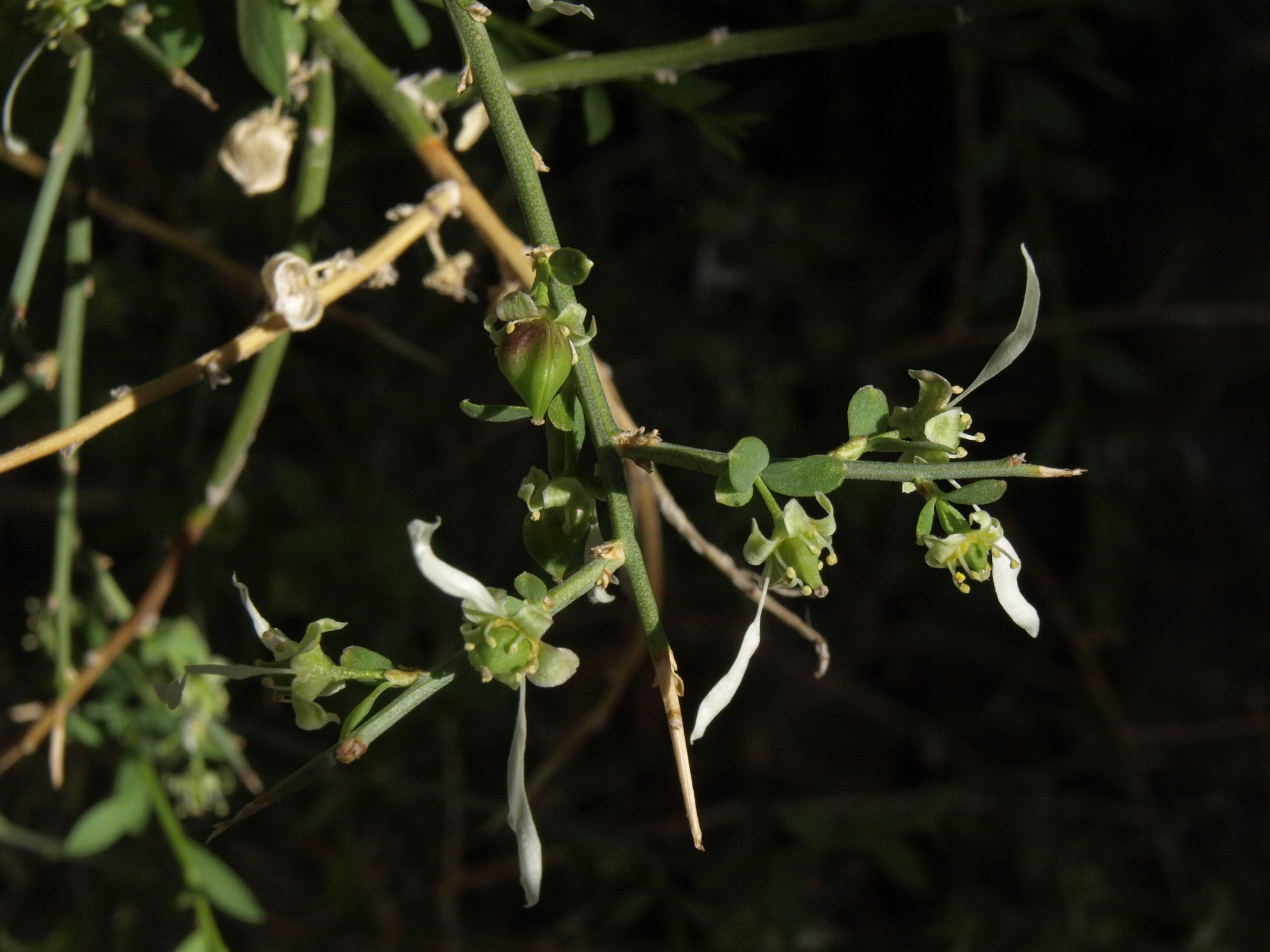
Glossopetalon spinescens in the White Mountains, Nevada, 1,715 m (5,630 ft) elevation in early May. The flowers are pollinated and beginning to fruit, but not all the petals have been shed. Dehiscent, persistent follicles can be seen from the previous year. The leaves have largely been shed. The tips of the stems are beginning to die off; their sharp, tapered, hardened ends function as spines.

This shrub forms a dense, erect clump of many thin, branching, thorny stems approaching 3 metres (9.8 ft) in maximum height. The green oval leaves are less than two centimeters long.

Small white-petalled flowers appear in the leaf axils. The fruit is a single or double follicle a few millimeters wide, and 3 to 5mm long. A follicle is a fruit which splits lengthwise when it is ripe to release its seeds. It is longitudinally striated or ribbed, and coloured green when young, turning light brown.

== Taxonomy ==
Glossopetalon spinescens was described by the American botanist Asa Gray in 1853, based on a specimen collected by Charles Wright in 1852 in a mountain ravine near a location called 'Frontera', in either New Mexico or Texas. It is the type species for the genus Glossopetalon.

G. spinescens is conceived at this time as a widespread and morphologically variable species, unlike the other three (as of 2015) recognised species of Glossopetalon, which are all restricted endemics with more narrowly variable morphologies. Six more-or-less geographical, intergrading varieties were recognized as of 2015.

Mason mentions in 2015 that the morphological characteristics distinguishing a particular variety are not reliable, and some named varieties seem to occur sympatrically with other varieties, whereas some varieties appear to be found in disjunct populations, thus that it was important a study should be done investigating the genetics of the different populations of the varieties. A 2021 study did just that. It found that G. spinescens was largely split into two main geographic lineages: a northwest one and a southeast one. The taxa G. clokeyi and G. texense were found to belong to either lineage respectively, and could therefore no longer parsimoniously be seen as distinct species. Consequently, both taxa were reduced to new varieties. A ninth additional variety was described from northern Arizona on the basis of its divergent DNA: goodwinii. It remains unclear which varieties exist in the southern half of Mexico.

- var. spinescens from southeastern Arizona, New Mexico, Texas, Chihuahua and Coahuila is early deciduous, the leaves either lacking stipules or with stipules less than 0.1 mm long.
- var. aridum M.E. Jones, from northwestern and central Arizona to California and Washington state, with early deciduous leaves (leafless throughout most of the year) and with stipules up to 0.9 mm long.
- var. clokeyi is basal to the cluster of northwestern varieties. It is only found in the Spring Mountains in Clark County, Nevada.
- var. goodwinii from northern Arizona was first described in 2021 on the basis of its divergent DNA.
- var. mexicanum, described in 1942, known from isolated calcareous outcrops in the Mexican states of Coahuila and Nuevo León. Small leaves, lacking stipules.
- var. meionandrum can be recognised by the connecting portion of the stipules with the stem being yellow or brownish. Retains leaves throughout most of the growing season.
- var. microphyllum, described in 1988, has stipules and small leaves half the size of the other varieties besides mexicanum. The branchlets turn orange-brown in colour at the end of their first year, in all other forms the branchlets turn yellowish, but only after two or three years.
- var. planitierum can be recognised by the connecting portion of the stipules with the stem being robust and dark reddish purple to nearly black. Retains leaves throughout most of the growing season. From Colorado, New Mexico, Oklahoma and Texas.
- var. texensis is most closely related to var. spinescens.

== Distribution and habitat ==
Glossopetalon spinescens occurs across a wide range, from southeastern Washington state in the north, south to isolated disjunct populations in the south of Mexico (Guanajuato, Oaxaca, Tlaxcala and Veracruz).

Besides the Mexican states mentioned above, G. spinescens also occurs in the states of Chihuahua, Coahuila, Nuevo León, Sonora and Tamaulipas.

In the US it occurs, from north to south and west to east, in the states of Washington, Idaho, Montana, Oregon, Wyoming, California, Nevada, Utah, Colorado, Arizona, New Mexico, Oklahoma and Texas. It is not widespread in these states, but is rather localised to a number of counties. In general, this is a rare plant, found most often in scattered concentrations. In Montana and Wyoming it is especially rare, only occurring in a single county (Beaverhead and Sweetwater, respectively). It grows in chaparral and brush country, rocky slopes, canyons and cliffs.

== Ecology ==
It occurs in calcareous soils on limestone. It occurs at altitudes of approximately 850 to 2,200 m (2,790 to 7,220 ft) in Arizona. It grows on hillsides, rocky slopes and crevices and ledges of cliffs in canyons and outcrops in desert scrub, grasslands, chaparral and juniper woodland habitats.

It flowers from March to September throughout its range, March or April to May in Arizona.
