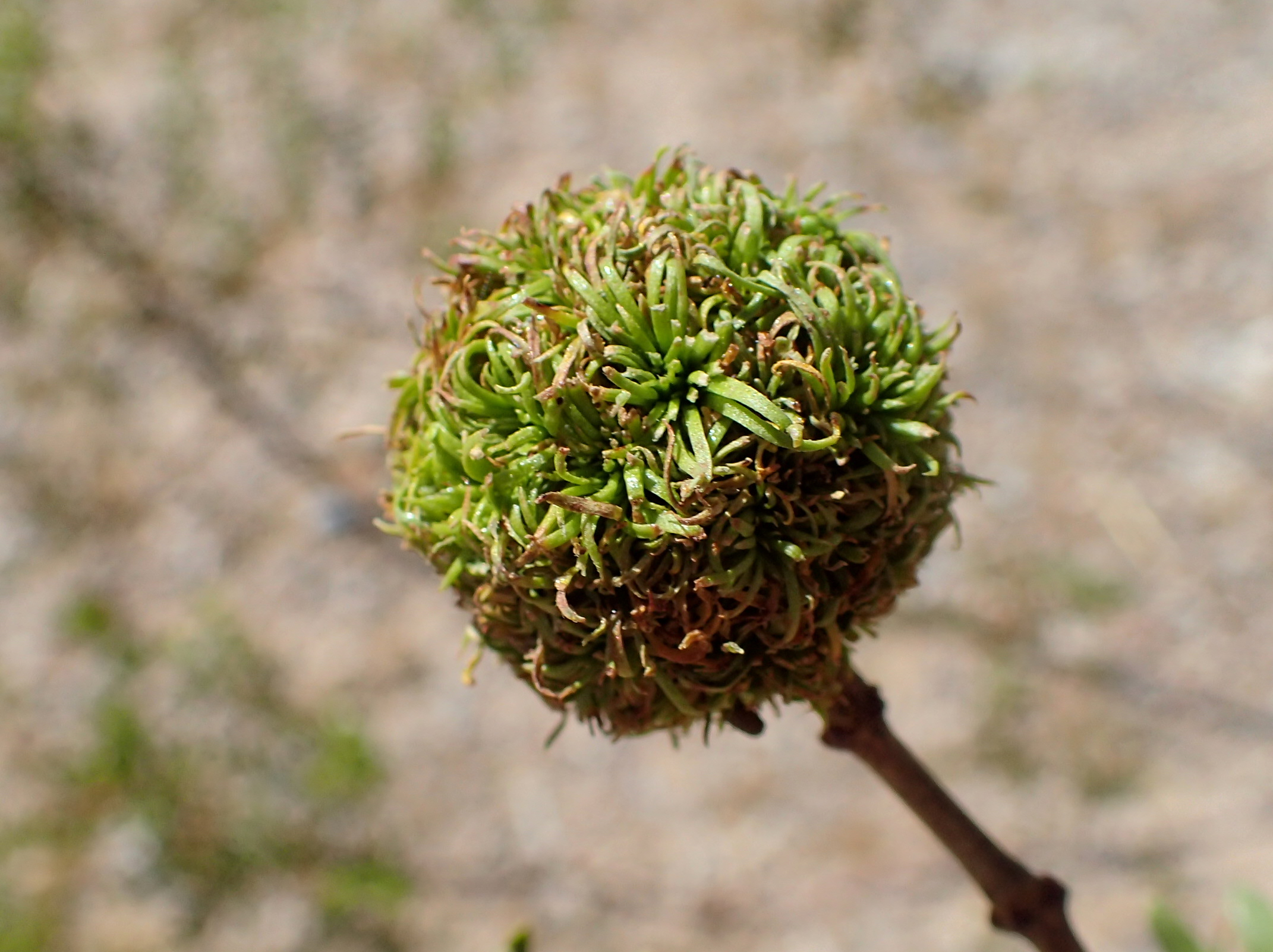
- Galls caused by Asphondylia auripila growing on Larrea tridentata

Scientific classification
- Kingdom: Animalia
- Phylum: Arthropoda
- Clade: Pancrustacea
- Class: Insecta
- Order: Diptera
- Family: Cecidomyiidae
- Genus: Asphondylia
- Species group: Asphondylia auripila species group
- Species: A. auripila

Binomial name
- Asphondylia auripila Felt, 1907

= Asphondylia auripila =

Species of fly

Asphondylia auripila, the large creosote gall midge, is a species of gall midge in the family Cecidomyiidae. This species utilizes creosote bushes as host plants for forming galls. This species of midge can be found in southwestern North America, spanning around U.S. and Mexico states such as California, Nevada, Arizona, Utah, New Mexico, Texas, Sonora, Chihuahua, Baja California, and Baja California Sur. The habitat of this species is based in deserts, spanning from the Mojave Desert to the Baja California Desert and Chihuahuan Desert of Mexico. Adults grow around 4 millimeters in length and appear brown-orange in coloration, but can be difficult to tell apart from other species due to looking morphologically similar. The galls of this midge can be identified by their spherical shape, bushy/leafy appearance, and green coloration for developing midges. Galls begin to turn brown after fully developed midges emerge. These midges create galls when females utilize their ovipositor to insert eggs into the host plant along with a fungal spore from the mycangia (A specialized body part used for transporting fungi). This fungi causes the plant to begin growing a gall while the fungal mycelium grows to line the inside of the gall. The eggs inside then hatch and the larvae feed on the mycelium before eventually developing into adults and emerge from the gall. The galls do not appear to cause the host plant any harm. The emergence of adults is timed with the host plants periods of growth associated with winter, spring, or summer rain fall.

== See also ==
- Creosote gall midge
