= Crossosoma parviflora =

Conservation status
- Apparently Secure (NatureServe)

Scientific classification
- Kingdom: Plantae
- Clade: Tracheophytes
- Clade: Angiosperms
- Clade: Eudicots
- Clade: Rosids
- Order: Crossosomatales
- Family: Crossosomataceae
- Genus: Crossosoma
- Species: C. parviflora

Binomial name
- Crossosoma parviflora B.L.Rob. & Fernald

Synonyms
- Crossosoma parviflorum

Species of tree

Crossosoma parviflora, known by the common name small-flowered rockflower, is one of only a few species in the flowering plant family Crossosomataceae.

== Distribution ==
Crossosoma parviflora is native to desert habitats in Arizona.
