= (+)-Larreatricin hydroxylase =

Class of enzymes

Identifiers
- EC no.: 1.14.99.47

Databases
- IntEnz: IntEnz view
- BRENDA: BRENDA entry
- ExPASy: NiceZyme view
- KEGG: KEGG entry
- MetaCyc: metabolic pathway
- PRIAM: profile
- PDB structures: RCSB PDB PDBe PDBsum
Search
- PMC: articles
- PubMed: articles
- NCBI: proteins

(+)-Larreatricin hydroxylase (EC 1.14.99.47) is an enzyme with systematic name (+)-larreatricin:oxygen 3'-hydroxylase. This enzyme catalyses the following chemical reaction

(+)-larreatricin + O_{2} + AH_{2} $\rightleftharpoons$ (+)-3'-hydroxylarreatricin + A + H_{2}O

This enzyme is isolated from the plant Larrea tridentata (creosote bush) and can be produced recombinantly.
