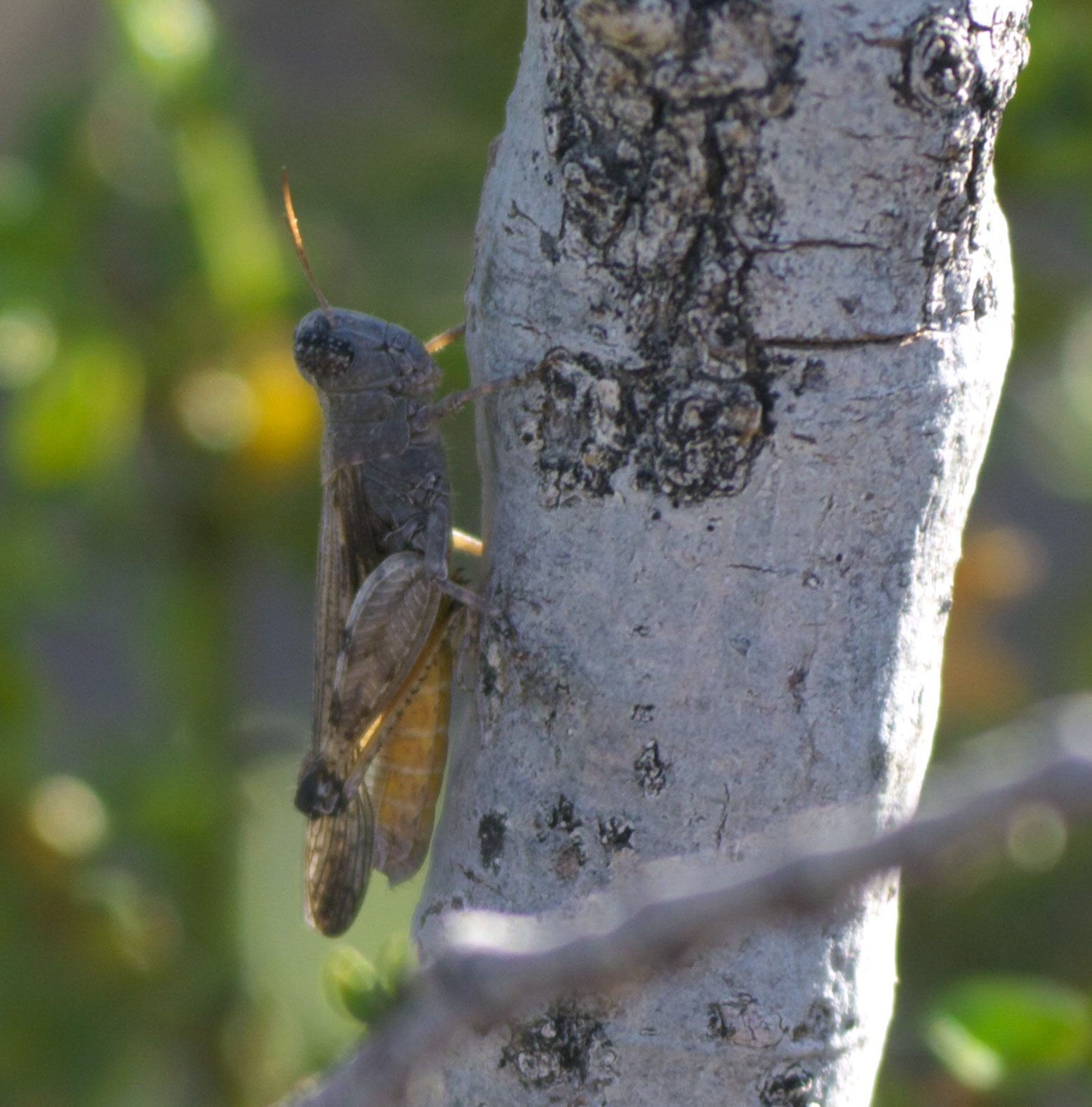

Scientific classification
- Domain: Eukaryota
- Kingdom: Animalia
- Phylum: Arthropoda
- Class: Insecta
- Order: Orthoptera
- Suborder: Caelifera
- Family: Acrididae
- Subfamily: Gomphocerinae
- Genus: Ligurotettix
- Species: L. coquilletti

Binomial name
- Ligurotettix coquilletti McNeill, 1897

= Ligurotettix coquilletti =

Species of grasshopper

Ligurotettix coquilletti, known generally as the desert clicker grasshopper or creosote bush grasshopper, is a species of slant-faced grasshopper in the family Acrididae. As its common name suggests, the species feeds on Larrea tridentata. It is found in Central America and North America, in North America specifically in the Mojave and Sonoran deserts. Males defend individual creosote plants as mating territories, often preferring plants with lower amounts of toxic chemicals.
