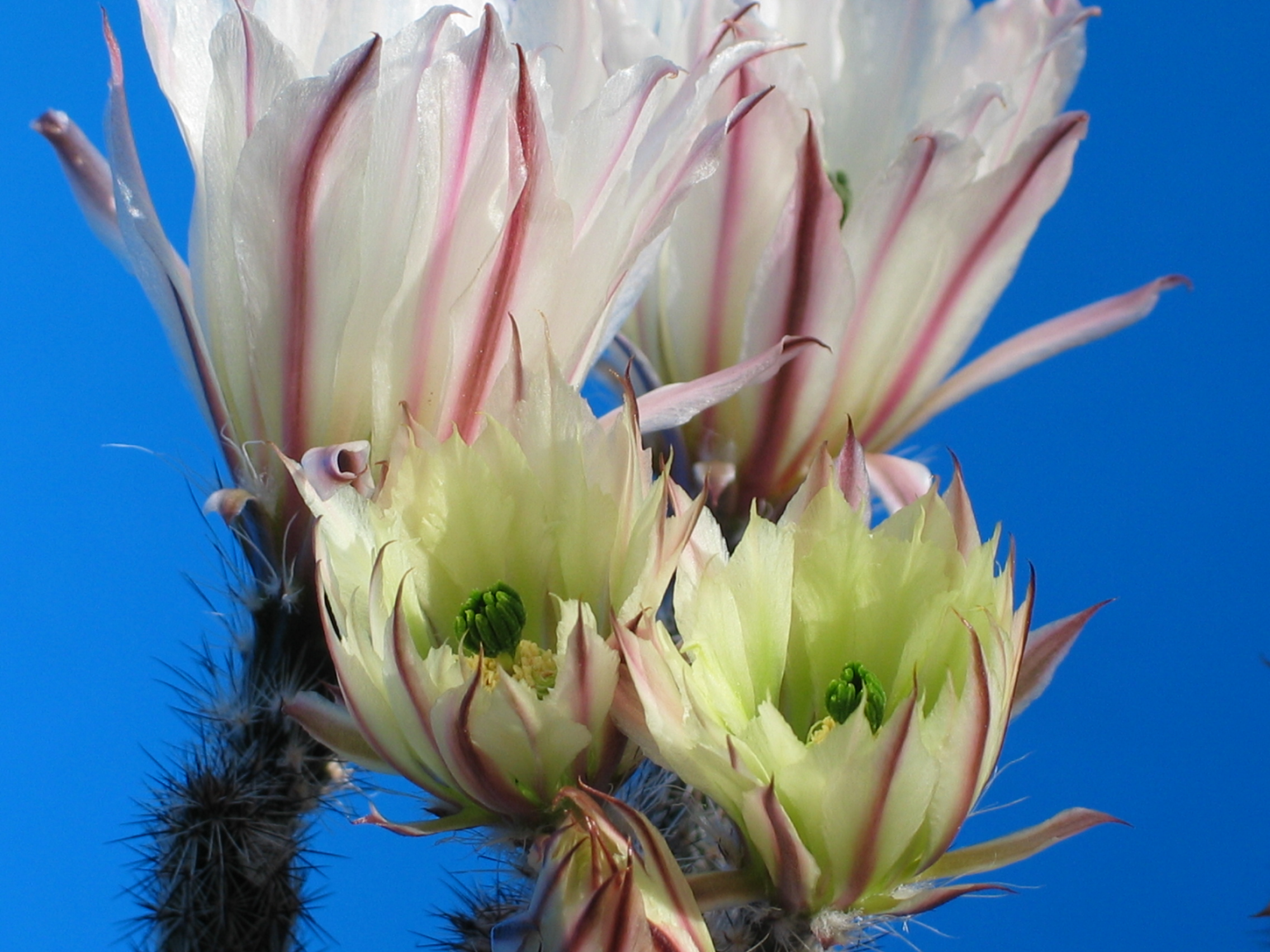

Scientific classification
- Kingdom: Plantae
- Clade: Tracheophytes
- Clade: Angiosperms
- Clade: Eudicots
- Order: Caryophyllales
- Family: Cactaceae
- Subfamily: Cactoideae
- Genus: Echinocereus
- Species: E. waldeisii

Binomial name
- Echinocereus waldeisii Haugg 1994

Synonyms
- Echinocereus tamaulipensis subsp. waldeisii (Haugg) Mich.Lange 1995; Echinocereus tamaulipensis subsp. deherdtii Mich.Lange 1995

= Echinocereus waldeisii =

Species of cactus

Echinocereus waldeisii is a species of cactus native to Mexico.

== Description ==
Echinocereus waldeisii typically grows with a main shoot that can produce several climbing side shoots and up to eight carrot-like rhizomes. This plant usually forms a symbiotic relationship with creosote bushes (Larrea tridentata) via mycorrhiza, allowing its thin shoots to lean on them. The green, slender, cylindrical shoots have a diameter of 0.5 to 1.5 cm (0.20 to 0.59 in) and can grow over 2 m (6 ft 7 in) high. They have eight low, slightly tuberculated ribs. The thorn pads consist of 20 to 27 radial spines and 6 to 10 central spines, each 4–8 mm (0.16–0.31 in) long.

The funnel-shaped flowers are light to creamy yellow with brown central stripes on the outer petals. They usually appear at the shoot tips and are up to 5 cm (2.0 in) long and 6 cm (2.4 in) in diameter.

The olive-green to brownish, egg-shaped fruits have a few thorny pads that fall off when ripe. The fruits are sweet and fruity, reaching up to 2.5 cm (0.98 in) in size.

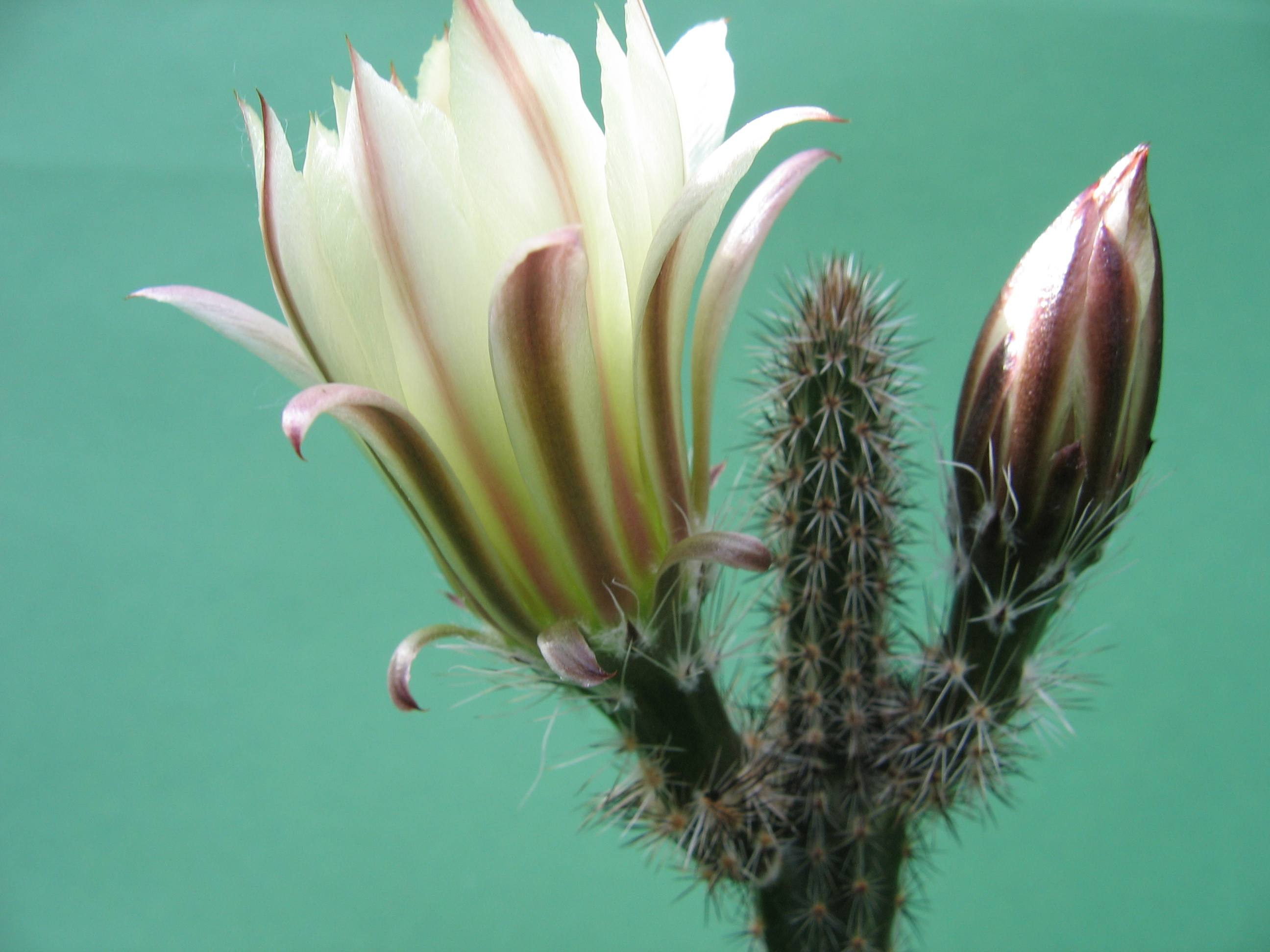
Flowers

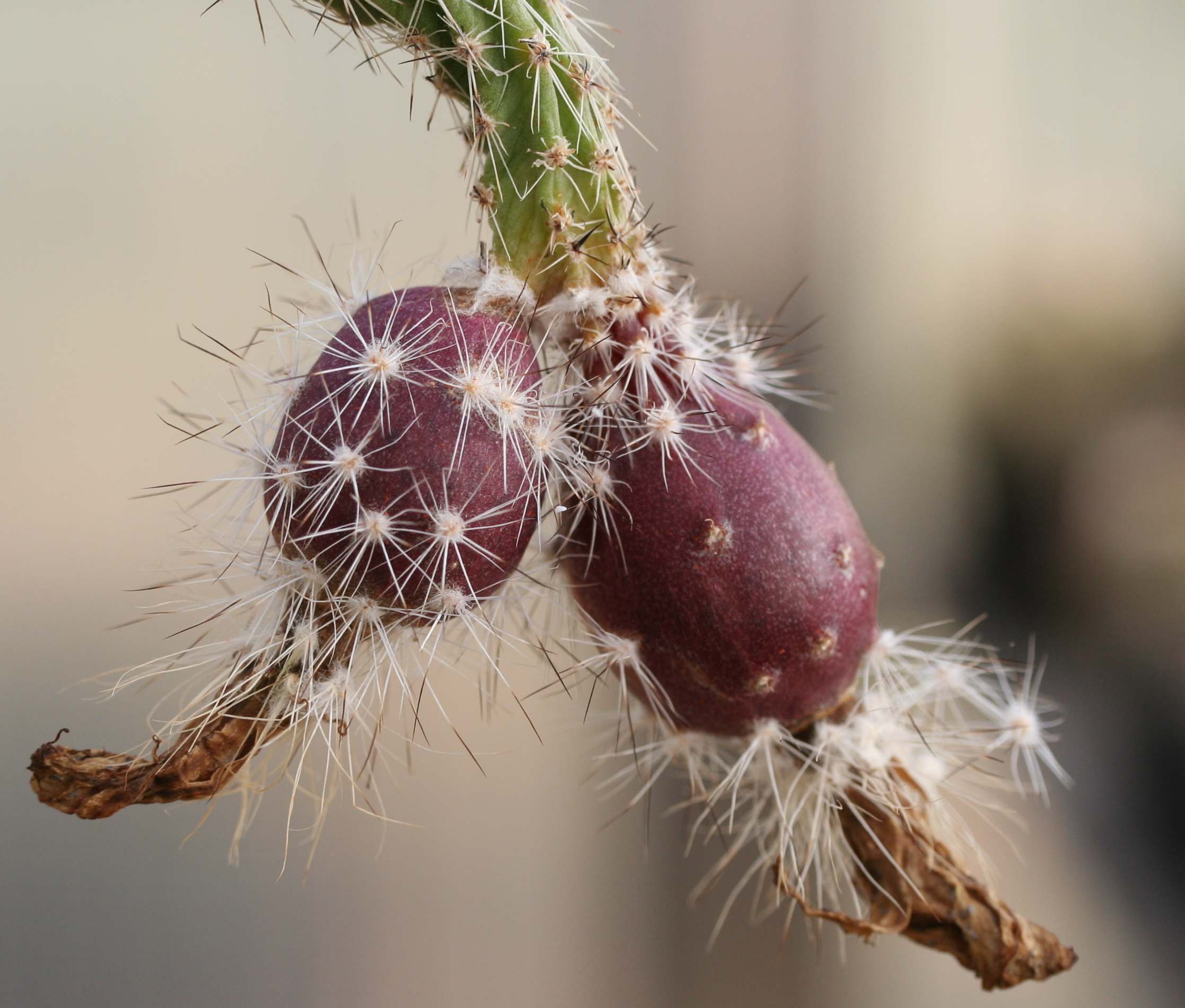
Fruits

== Distribution ==
Echinocereus waldeisii is a steno-endemic species found in the semidesert brushlands of Mier and Noriega region, on the border of the Mexican states of Nuevo León, Tamaulipas, and San Luis Potosí growing between elevations of 1,200 to 1,500 m (3,900 to 4,900 ft). It is considered endangered due to its limited and specialized habitat.

== Taxonomy ==
The species was first described by Erich Haugg in 1993. The species is named in honor of Dieter Waldeis, who discovered it.
