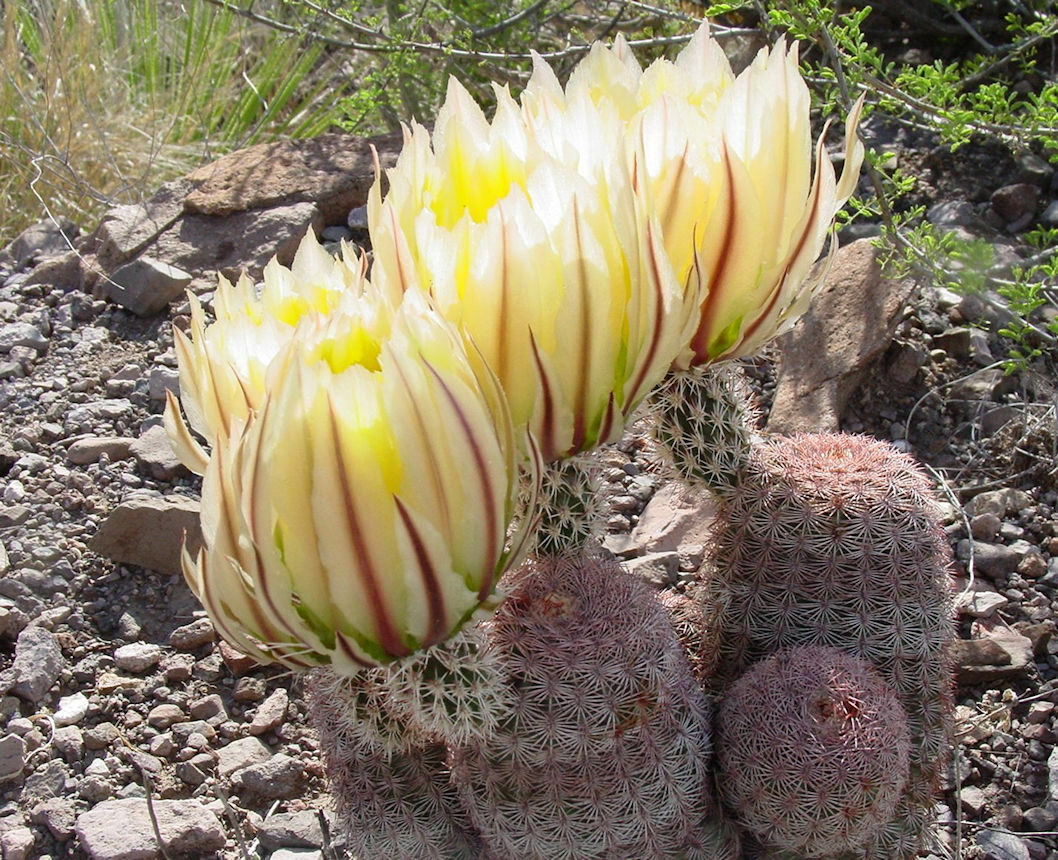

Conservation status
- Vulnerable (IUCN 3.1)

Scientific classification
- Kingdom: Plantae
- Clade: Tracheophytes
- Clade: Angiosperms
- Clade: Eudicots
- Order: Caryophyllales
- Family: Cactaceae
- Subfamily: Cactoideae
- Genus: Echinocereus
- Species: E. perplexus

Binomial name
- Echinocereus perplexus W.Blum & A.P.Campos 2023

= Echinocereus perplexus =

Species of cactus

Echinocereus perplexus is a species of cactus native to Texas.

== Description ==
Echinocereus perplexus is a cactus species that usually branches and forms groups of 3 to 9 stems, with a combined diameter ranging from 15 to 40 cm (5.9 to 15.7 in). The stems are cylindrical, upright, and measure 9 to 20 cm (3.5 to 7.9 in) in height, with a diameter of 4.5 to 8 cm (1.8 to 3.1 in). The plant features 13 to 17 slightly tuberculate ribs, with areoles spaced 0.4 to 1.6 cm (0.16 to 0.63 in) apart. Each areole has 2 to 4 central spines that are 3 to 4 mm (0.12 to 0.16 in) long, reddish in color. These central spines are typically arranged in a vertical row, though sometimes four central spines form a cross shape. Additionally, each areole has 14 to 20 radial spines, measuring 4 to 9 mm (0.16 to 0.35 in) in length, also reddish, arranged in a comb-like pattern. The flowers are yellow and funnel-shaped. The tips of the tepals are white to yellow initially, gradually developing orange, pink, or magenta tones. The flowers are 8 to 10 cm (3.1 to 3.9 in) long and 9 to 12 cm (3.5 to 4.7 in) in diameter.

The fruits are oval-shaped, measuring 2.5 to 3 cm (0.98 to 1.18 in) in length and approximately 2.5 cm (0.98 in) in diameter. They are dark green on the outside, with juicy white pulp that contains pink inclusions. The seeds are black and 1.4 to 1.6 mm (0.055 to 0.063 in) in length. This species is tetraploid, with a chromosome number of 4n = 44.

== Distribution ==
Plants are found growing in igneous rock in western Texas, United States and eastern Chihuahua, Mexico at elevations between 900 and 2550 meters. Plants are found growing along with Larrea tridentata var. tridentata.

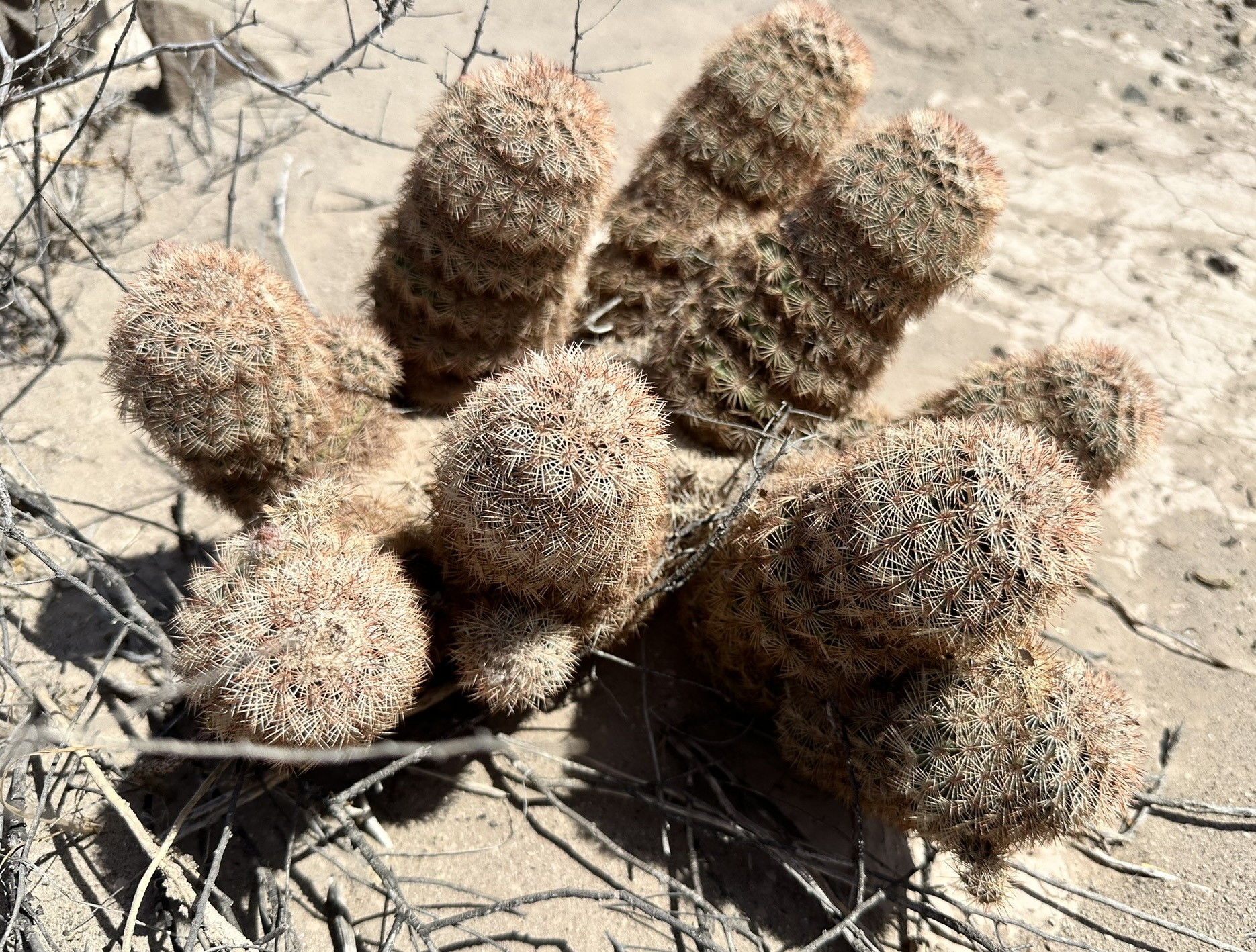
Plants growing in habitat in Texas

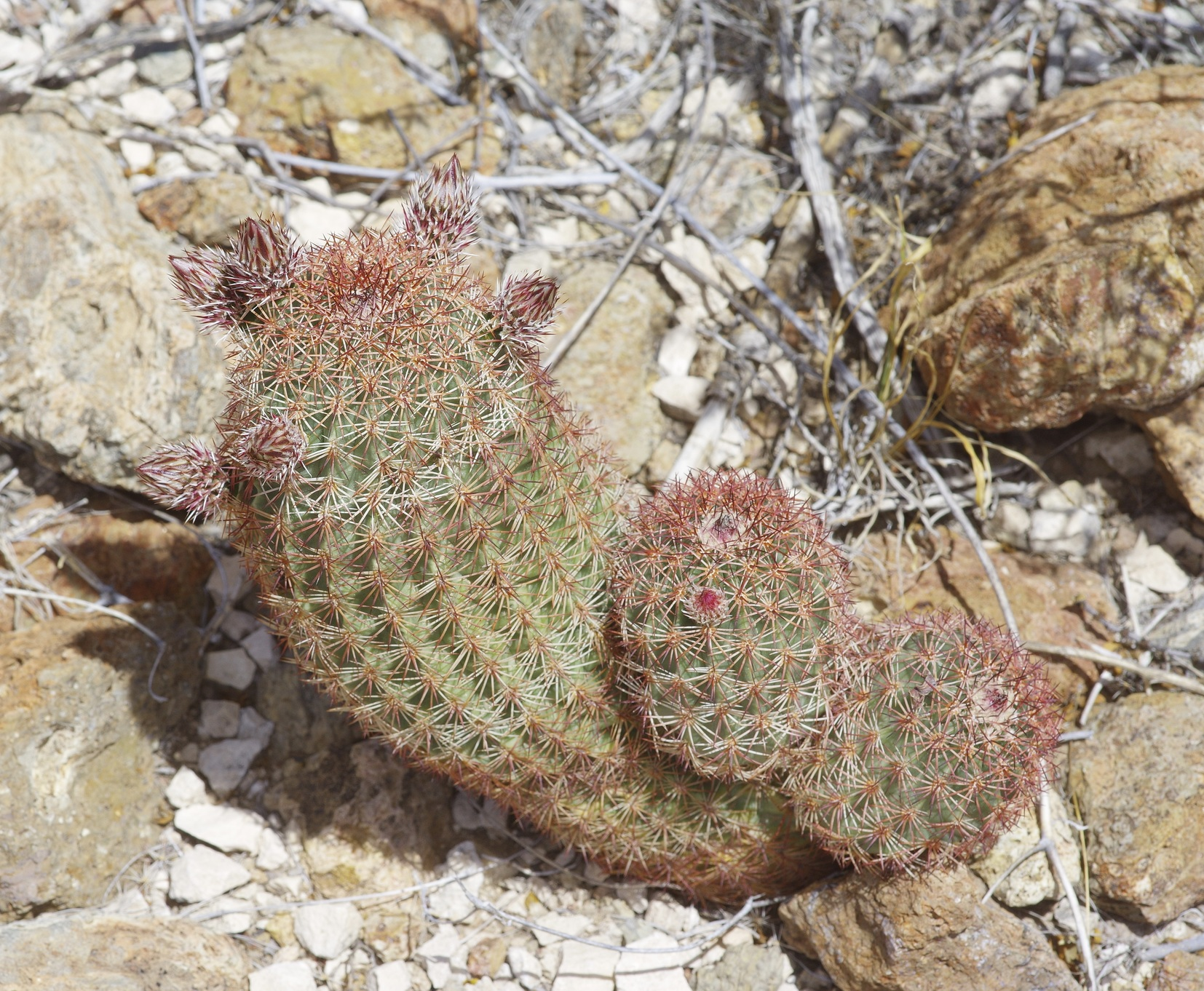

== Taxonomy ==
The plant was collected in 2023 by Wolfgang Blum and Aidan P. Campos. It was named after the confusing nature of the species evolutionary relationships within Echinocereus series Pectinati.
