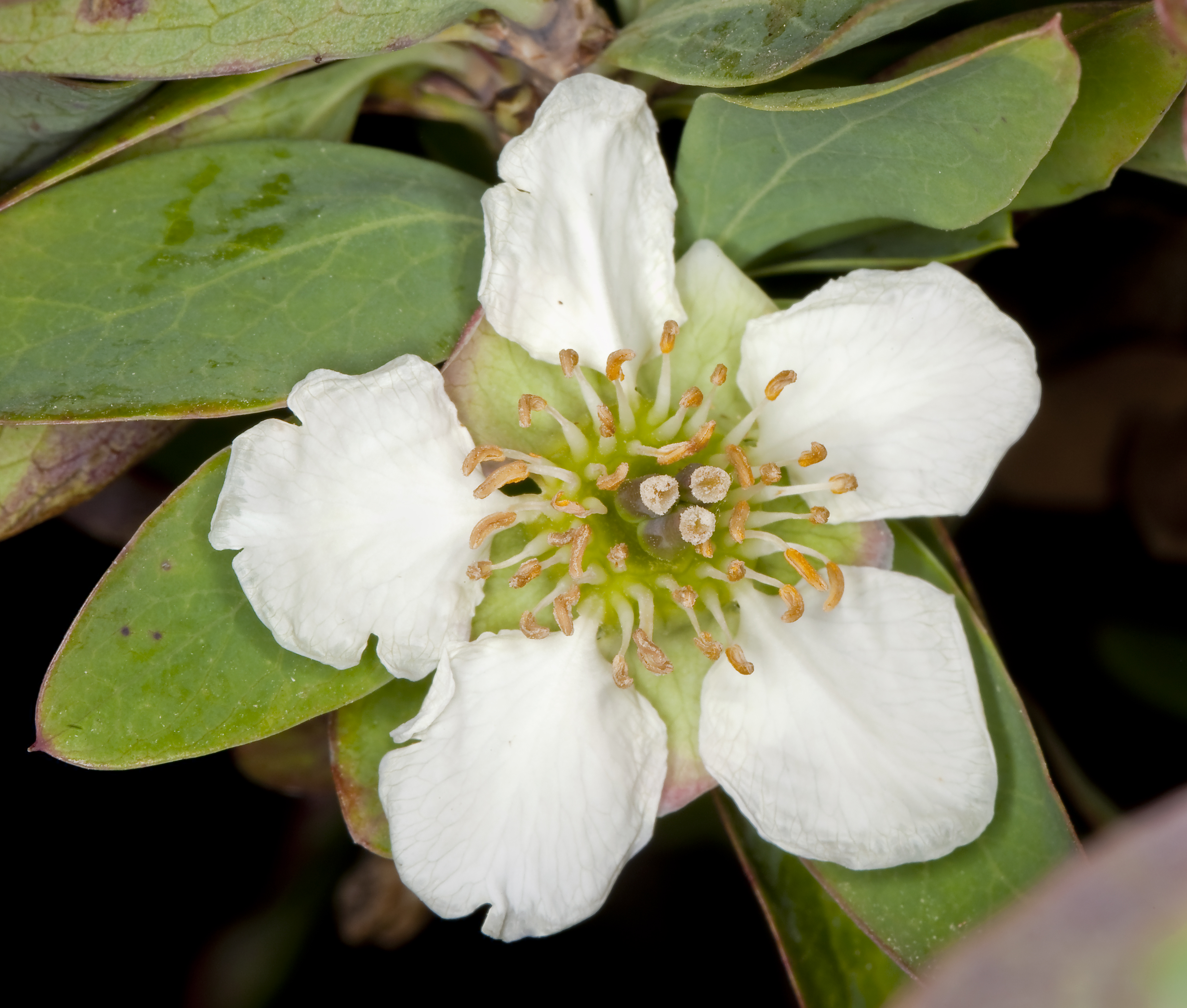

Conservation status
- Vulnerable (NatureServe)

Scientific classification
- Kingdom: Plantae
- Clade: Tracheophytes
- Clade: Angiosperms
- Clade: Eudicots
- Clade: Rosids
- Order: Crossosomatales
- Family: Crossosomataceae
- Genus: Crossosoma
- Species: C. californicum

Binomial name
- Crossosoma californicum Nutt.

= Crossosoma californicum =

Species of tree

Crossosoma californicum, known by the common name California rockflower, is one of only a few species in the flowering plant family Crossosomataceae.

== Distribution ==
Crossosoma californicum is native to San Clemente and Santa Catalina Islands, two of the Channel Islands of California, as well as Guadalupe Island off the coast of Baja California.

It is also known from one location on the mainland California coast at the Portuguese Bend Nature Preserve, on the Palos Verdes Peninsula of Los Angeles County.

== Description ==
Crossosoma californicum is a shrub or small tree sprawling to a maximum height of 5 metres (16 ft). The stem is intricately divided into many thorn-tipped branches lined with veiny, pale green, oval-shaped to rounded leaves up to 9 centimetres (3.5 in) long.

The species produces solitary flowers with round white petals, each one to 1.5 centimetres (0.59 in) long. At the center are numerous of stamens and 1-5 free carpels
