= Glossopetalon clokeyi =

Conservation status
- Imperiled (NatureServe)

Scientific classification
- Kingdom: Plantae
- Clade: Tracheophytes
- Clade: Angiosperms
- Clade: Eudicots
- Clade: Rosids
- Order: Crossosomatales
- Family: Crossosomataceae
- Genus: Glossopetalon
- Species: G. clokeyi

Binomial name
- Glossopetalon clokeyi (Ensign) H.St.John

Synonyms
- Forsellesia clokeyi Ensign

Species of flowering plant

Glossopetalon clokeyi, known as Clokey's greasebush is a species of flowering plant native to western North America.

== Distribution and habitat ==
Clokey's greasebush is a rare species, endemic to the Spring Mountains in Clark County, Nevada. It is threatened by recreational climbing activities on the steep limestone cliffs where it occurs.
