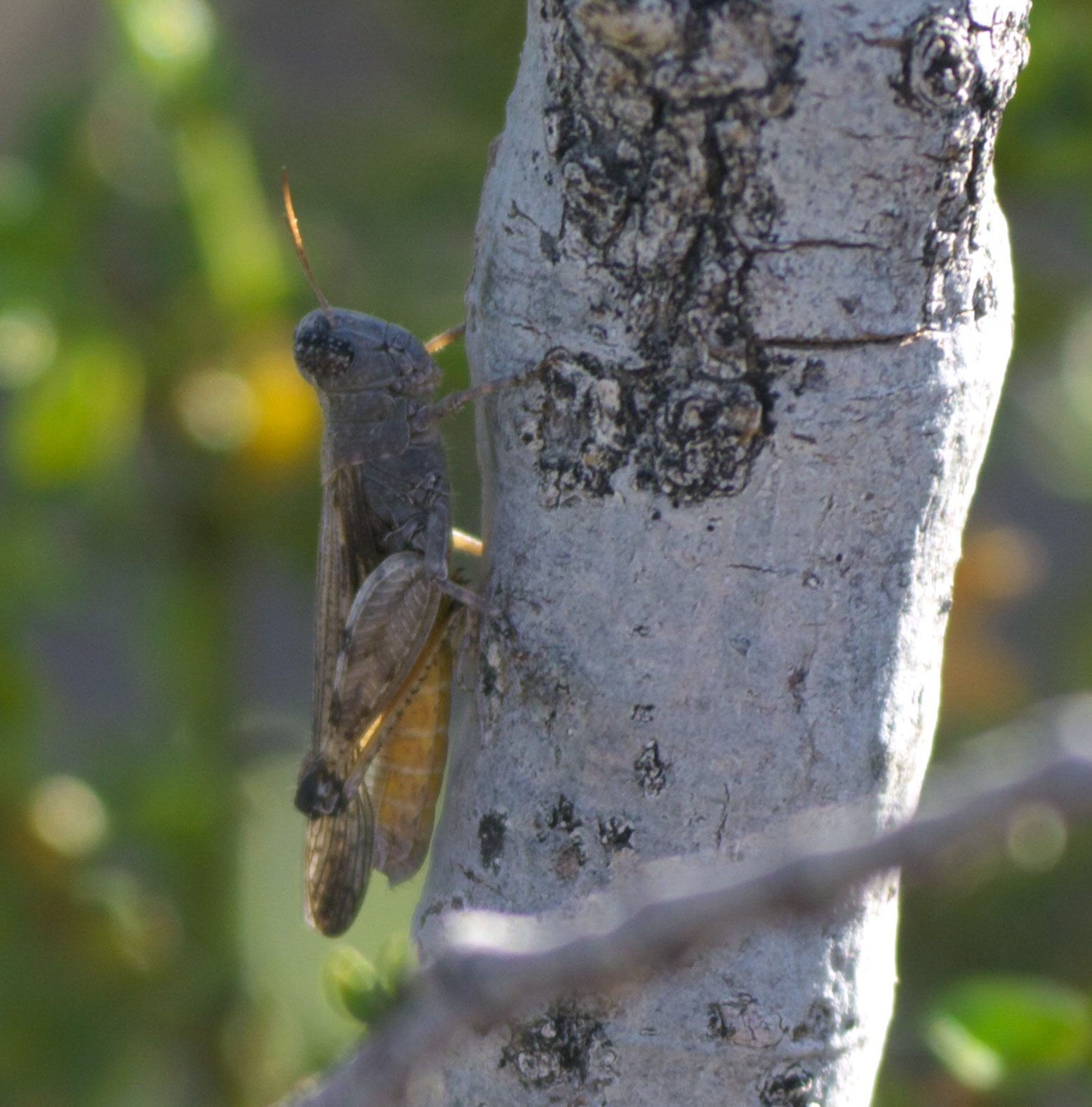
- Ligurotettix coquilletti

Scientific classification
- Domain: Eukaryota
- Kingdom: Animalia
- Phylum: Arthropoda
- Class: Insecta
- Order: Orthoptera
- Suborder: Caelifera
- Family: Acrididae
- Subfamily: Gomphocerinae
- Genus: Ligurotettix; McNeill, 1897

= Ligurotettix =

Genus of grasshoppers

Ligurotettix is a genus of clicker grasshoppers in the family Acrididae. There are at least two described species in Ligurotettix.

== Species ==
These two species belong to the genus Ligurotettix:

- Ligurotettix coquilletti McNeill, 1897 (desert clicker grasshopper)
- Ligurotettix planum (Bruner, 1904) (Pecos clicker grasshopper)
