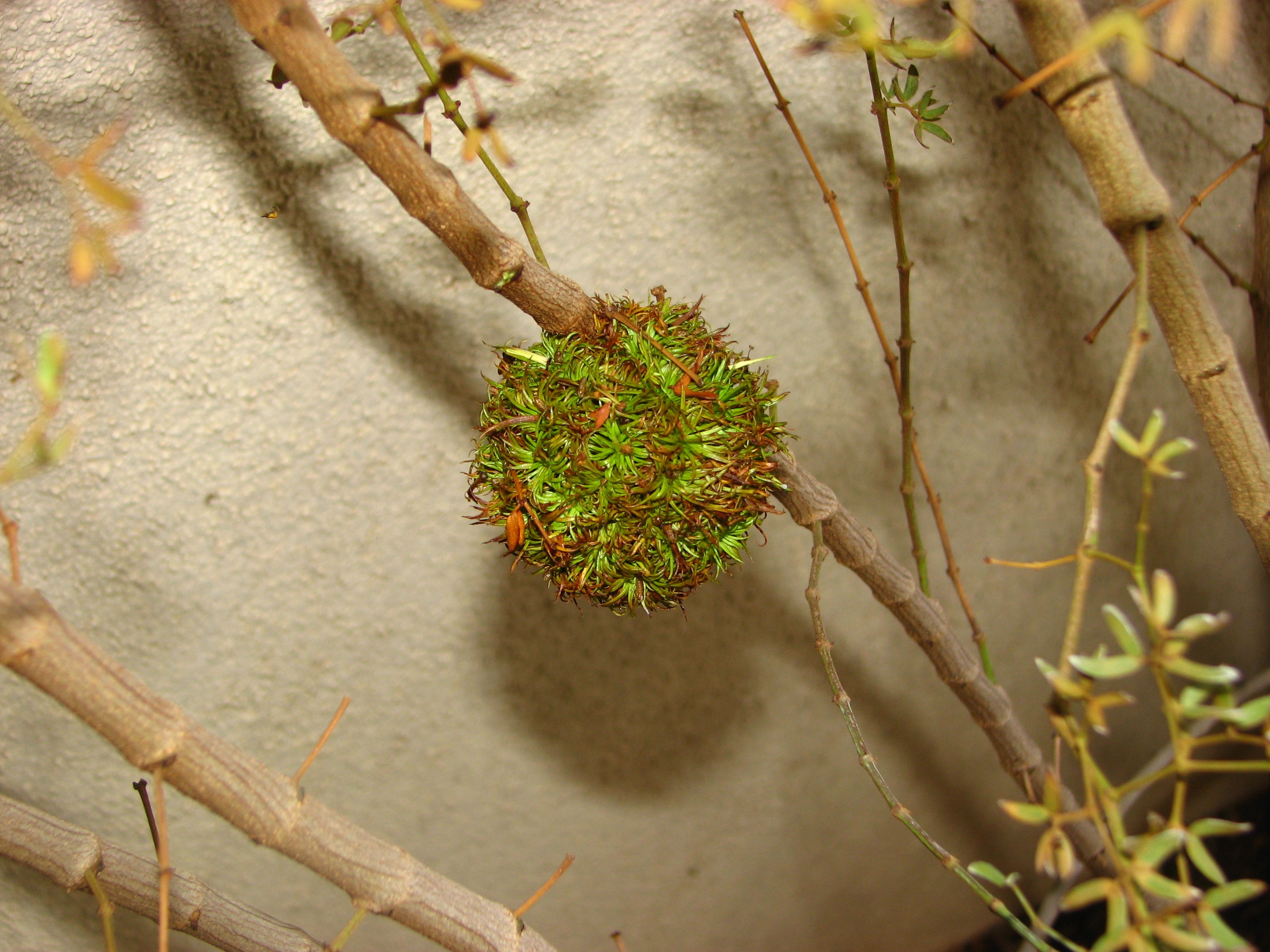
- Gall created by Asphondylia auripila

Scientific classification
- Kingdom: Animalia
- Phylum: Arthropoda
- Clade: Pancrustacea
- Class: Insecta
- Order: Diptera
- Family: Cecidomyiidae
- Genus: Asphondylia
- Species group: Asphondylia auripila species group

= Creosote gall midge =

Species of fly

Creosote gall midges are gall-inducing flies in the Asphondylia auripila group . This group consists of 15 closely related species of flies which inhabit creosote bush (Larrea tridentata). They have partitioned the plant ecologically with different gall midge species inhabiting the leaves, stems, buds, and flowers of creosote bush. Each species induces a uniquely shaped gall but the insects are otherwise morphologically very similar and very difficult to tell apart.

Their life cycle begins when the female oviposits into the part of the plant which her species prefers, she inserts her egg along with a fungal spore from a mycangia (a small pocket to store fungal spores). A gall forms and the fungal mycelium grows to line the inside of the gall, when the egg hatches the developing larva feeds upon the fungus. Adult emergence is timed with periods of plant growth associated with winter, spring, or summer rain fall. In contrast to many other groups of plant-feeding insects (which form new species through changes to new host plants) the evolution of new species in the A. auripila group seems to be a result of colonizing new parts of the same plant and/or colonization of new seasons of plant growth.

== List of species ==
The Asphondylia genus has over 60 described species. Within the genus the creosote gall midge species form a species group, the A. auripila group. Species described this far (by host-plant part) include:

- Asphondylia auripila – stem gall
- Asphondylia barbata – leaf gall
- Asphondylia bullata – stem gall
- Asphondylia clavata – leaf gall
- Asphondylia digitata – leaf gall
- Asphondylia discalis – leaf gall
- Asphondylia fabalis – leaf gall
- Asphondylia florea – flower gall
- Asphondylia foliosa – stem gall
- Asphondylia pilosa – leaf gall
- Asphondylia resinosa – stem gall
- Asphondylia rosetta – stem gall
- Asphondylia apicata – bud gall
- Asphondylia silicula – leaf gall
- Asphondylia villosa – leaf gall
