= Velascoa =

Scientific classification
- Kingdom: Plantae
- Clade: Embryophytes
- Clade: Tracheophytes
- Clade: Angiosperms
- Clade: Eudicots
- Clade: Rosids
- Order: Crossosomatales
- Family: Crossosomataceae
- Genus: Velascoa; Calderón & Rzed.
- Species: V. recondita

Binomial name
- Velascoa recondita Calderón & Rzed.

Genus of flowering plants

Velascoa is a monotypic genus of flowering plants belonging to the family Crossosomataceae. It only contains one known species, Velascoa recondita.

It is native to a single location (as far as known at the time of discovery) in Landa de Matamoros Municipality in Querétaro in central Mexico.

The genus name of Velascoa is in honour of José María Velasco Gómez (1840–1912), a Mexican painter, polymath and naturalist. The Latin specific epithet of recondita means 'hidden', and was chosen to allude to being found in truly hidden locations, far from roads and villages, and for its habit of growing hidden in cracks amongst limestone boulders on inaccessible, vertical cliffs. Because of the harsh climate, it took botanists five years, after discovering the plant, to collect flowers and mature fruit of an individual to make a good holotype, so the new species could be properly described. It was first described and published in 1997 in volume 39 of the Acta Botanica Mexicana on page 54, by the Mexican husband-wife team of botanists Graciela Calderon de Rzedowski and Jerzy Rzedowski.
