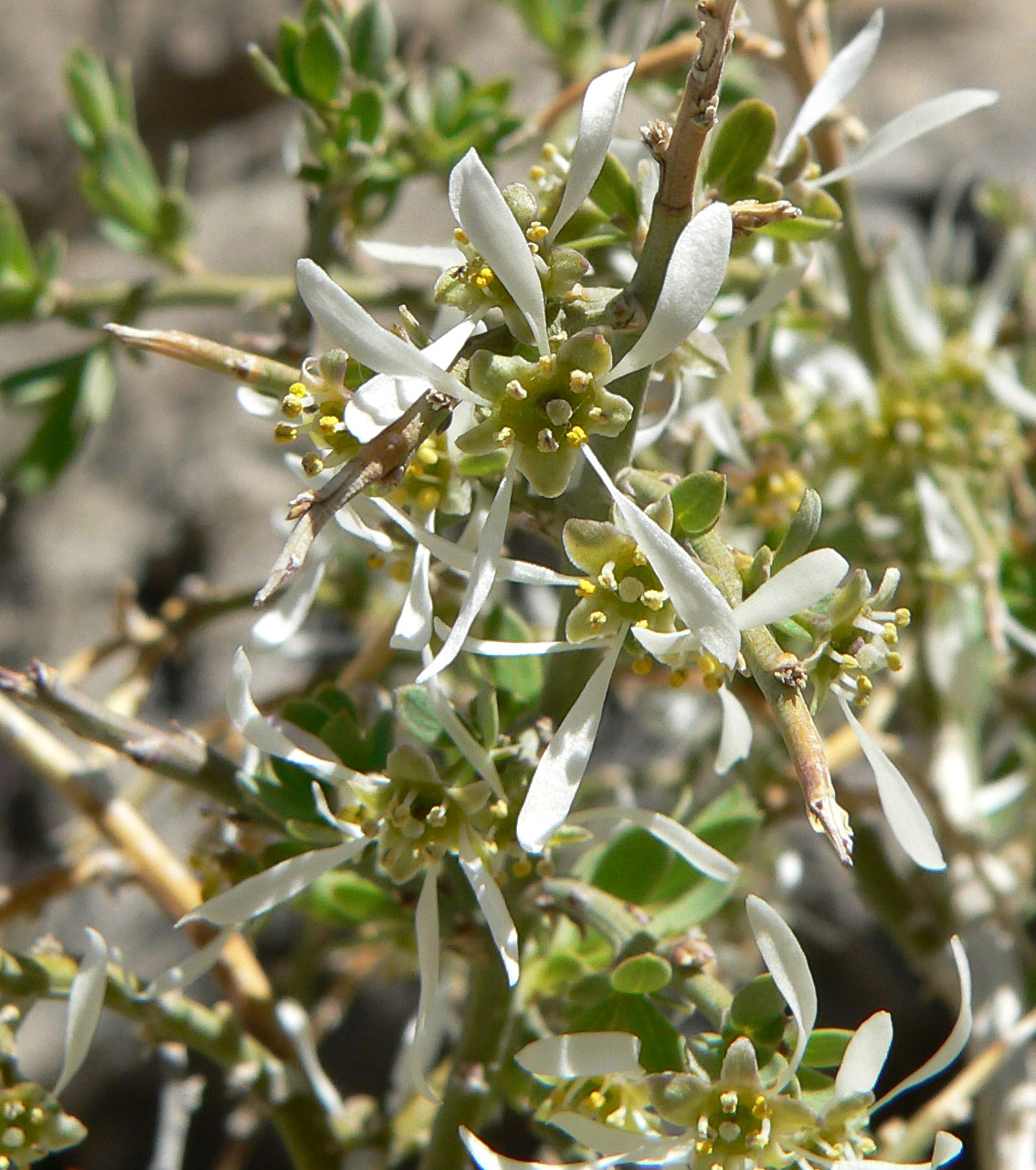
- Glossopetalon spinescens

Scientific classification
- Kingdom: Plantae
- Clade: Tracheophytes
- Clade: Angiosperms
- Clade: Eudicots
- Clade: Rosids
- Order: Crossosomatales
- Family: Crossosomataceae
- Genus: Glossopetalon; Gray

Species
- 2 or 4, see text

= Glossopetalon =

Genus of flowering plants

Glossopetalon is a small genus of shrubs in the plant family Crossosomataceae. These plants are sometimes called greasebushes. They are native to Mexico and the western United States, where they can be found on dry mountain slopes.

These are usually small shrubs, although Glossopetalon spinescens can reach up to three metres in favoured locations. They have thorny, tangling branches and white flowers with petals that are easily shed, giving them an untidy appearance. G. pungens is not thorny, and is a vertically prostrate subshrub which is usually found as a small tangled mat of stems hugging sheer cliffs.

Glossopetalon was described by the American botanist Asa Gray in 1853. Gray first placed his new genus in the Celastraceae family, but twenty years later thought it was most closely related to Staphylea, then in the Sapindaceae, and a few authors accepted this classification at the time (1880). Within two decades (1897), however, this genus was placed back in the Celastraceae again, where it remained until 1978. It was placed in Crossosomataceae by Thorne and Scogin at that time, as the third genus known in this small family.

Edward Lee Greene noticed that the generic name Glossopetalon was extremely similar to the name Glossopetalum, which had been coined by Johann Christian Daniel von Schreber in 1789 for another genus also placed in the Celastraceae at the time (Goupia), and considered Glossopetalon to be a homonym of that name, so in 1893 Greene officially renamed the genus Forsellesia. It continues to be the subject of a dispute about whether its proper name is Forsellesia or Glossopetalon.

The type species is G. spinescens.

In 1942 eight species were recognised. Of those, G. meionandrum, G. nevadense, G. planitierum and G. stipuliferum were all placed in synonymy with G. spinescens in 1988. Thus, the remaining species included in 2015 were:

- Glossopetalon clokeyi - Clokey's greasebush
- Glossopetalon pungens - dwarf greasebush
- Glossopetalon spinescens - spiny greasebush
- Glossopetalon texense - Texas greasebush

In 2021 a phylogenetic study found that G. clokeyi and G. texense were not distinct as species, and belonged within G. spinescens as well.

The species prefer dry limestone substrates.
