= Ligurotettix planum =

Scientific classification
- Domain: Eukaryota
- Kingdom: Animalia
- Phylum: Arthropoda
- Class: Insecta
- Order: Orthoptera
- Suborder: Caelifera
- Family: Acrididae
- Subfamily: Gomphocerinae
- Genus: Ligurotettix
- Species: L. planum

Binomial name
- Ligurotettix planum (Bruner, 1904)

Species of grasshopper

Ligurotettix planum, the Pecos clicker grasshopper, is a species of slant-faced grasshopper in the family Acrididae. It is found in Central America and North America.
