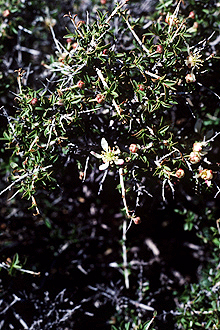

Conservation status
- Secure (NatureServe)

Scientific classification
- Kingdom: Plantae
- Clade: Tracheophytes
- Clade: Angiosperms
- Clade: Eudicots
- Clade: Rosids
- Order: Crossosomatales
- Family: Crossosomataceae
- Genus: Crossosoma
- Species: C. bigelovii

Binomial name
- Crossosoma bigelovii S.Wats.

Synonyms
- Crossosoma parviflorum Rob. & Fern.

= Crossosoma bigelovii =

Species of flowering plant

Crossosoma bigelovii, known by the common name ragged rockflower, is one of only a few species in the flowering plant family Crossosomataceae.

It is native to the Mojave, Chihuahuan, and Sonoran Deserts of North America. It has been reported from the states of Arizona, California, Nevada, Baja California, Chihuahua, and Sonora.

== Description ==
The species is a shrub that grows up to 1–2 metres (3.3–6.6 ft) tall. It is intricately divided into thorn-tipped branches lined with clusters of small, deciduous, gray-green leaves no longer than about 1.5 centimetres (0.59 in). The inflorescence bears a single flower, which has 5 white to purple-tinged petals about a centimeter long and narrowing to claws at their bases.

== Uses ==
Ragged rockflower is occasionally used as an ornamental plant in habitat gardens and natural landscaping. It can be grown from seed in well-drained soil for a desert butterfly garden. It is a difficult plant for the average homeowner to grow, as over-watering will kill it.
