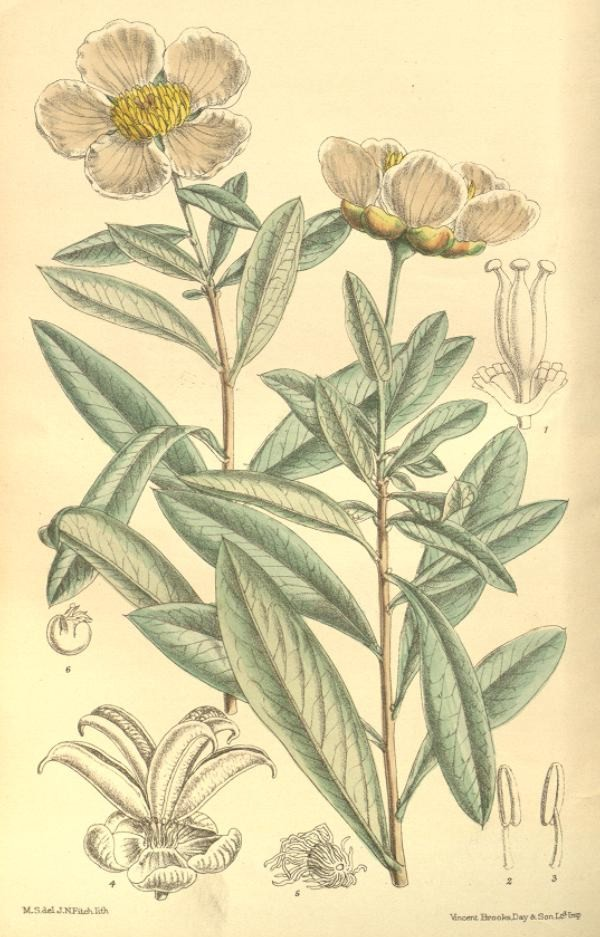
- Crossosoma californicum

Scientific classification
- Kingdom: Plantae
- Clade: Tracheophytes
- Clade: Angiosperms
- Clade: Eudicots
- Clade: Rosids
- Order: Crossosomatales
- Family: Crossosomataceae
- Genus: Crossosoma; Nutt.

Species
- See text

= Crossosoma =

Genus of flowering plants

Crossosoma is a genus of the plant family Crossosomataceae. It consists of three species of shrubs:

- Crossosoma bigelovii S.Wats. occurs in the deserts of California, Nevada, Arizona, and Baja California.
- Crossosoma californicum Nutt. is found on the Palos Verdes Peninsula and San Clemente and Santa Catalina islands of California, as well as Guadalupe Island in Baja California.
- Crossosoma parviflora B.L.Rob. & Fernald - Small-flowered crossoma, Arizona
