= C. T. Mason Jr. =

Botanist (1918–2012)

Dr. Charles T. Mason, Jr. (1918–2012) was from 1953–1993 curator of the ARIZ Herbarium at the University of Arizona in Tucson, Arizona.

Dr. Mason received his PhD from the University of California, Berkeley in 1949. At the University of Arizona, he for many years taught classes, described many new plant species, and helped expand the herbarium so that it is now one of the largest and most prestigious in the southwestern United States.
