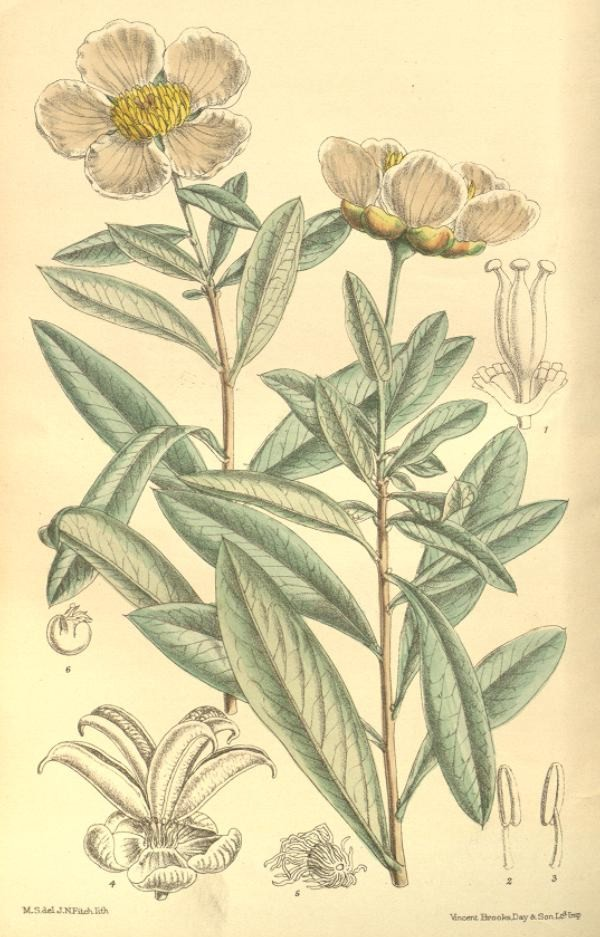
- Crossosoma californicum

Scientific classification
- Kingdom: Plantae
- Clade: Tracheophytes
- Clade: Angiosperms
- Clade: Eudicots
- Clade: Rosids
- Order: Crossosomatales
- Family: Crossosomataceae; Engl.

Genera
- Apacheria; Crossosoma; Glossopetalon; Velascoa

= Crossosomataceae =

Family of flowering plants

Crossosomataceae is a small plant family, consisting of four genera of xeromorphic shrubs found only in the dry parts of the American southwest and Mexico. This family has included up to ten species in the past, although as of 2026 six species are still recognized. Crossosoma are shrub-like plants which can vary from being 50 cm to 5 meters tall, with small alternating leaves that surround the stem, or leaves clustered in small spurts (fascicles). Apacheria, however, has opposite leaves. Crossosoma has usually white flowers that are generally bisexual and have 5 petals attached to a nectary disk, but in Velascoa the flowers are campanulate and have an extremely reduced nectary disk.

== Genera ==
- Apacheria - one species, cliff brittlebush, Apacheria chiricahuensis. This species is rare and endemic to parts of New Mexico and Arizona.
- Crossosoma - two species, C. bigelovii and C. californicum. C. bigelovii var. parviflora or C. parviflora was described for plants from the northern side of the Grand Canyon with a disjunct population in Sonora, with slightly smaller flowers than C. bigelovii, but it is not recognised as distinct even at a varietal level by the Flora of North America in the 2015 volume.
- Glossopetalon - The newest treatments recognize only two species of Glossopetalon (G. spinescens and G. pungens) with previously recognized species (G. clockeyi and G. texense) now considered as varieties of G. spinescens. Note that commonly references floras, such as Flora of North America, have not yet updated to reflect these taxonomic changes. This G. spinescens has the widest range out of any species in Crossosomataceae, with occurrences documented from Idaho to northern Mexico.
- Velascoa - one species, Velascoa recondita, monotypic and endemic to northeast Mexico
