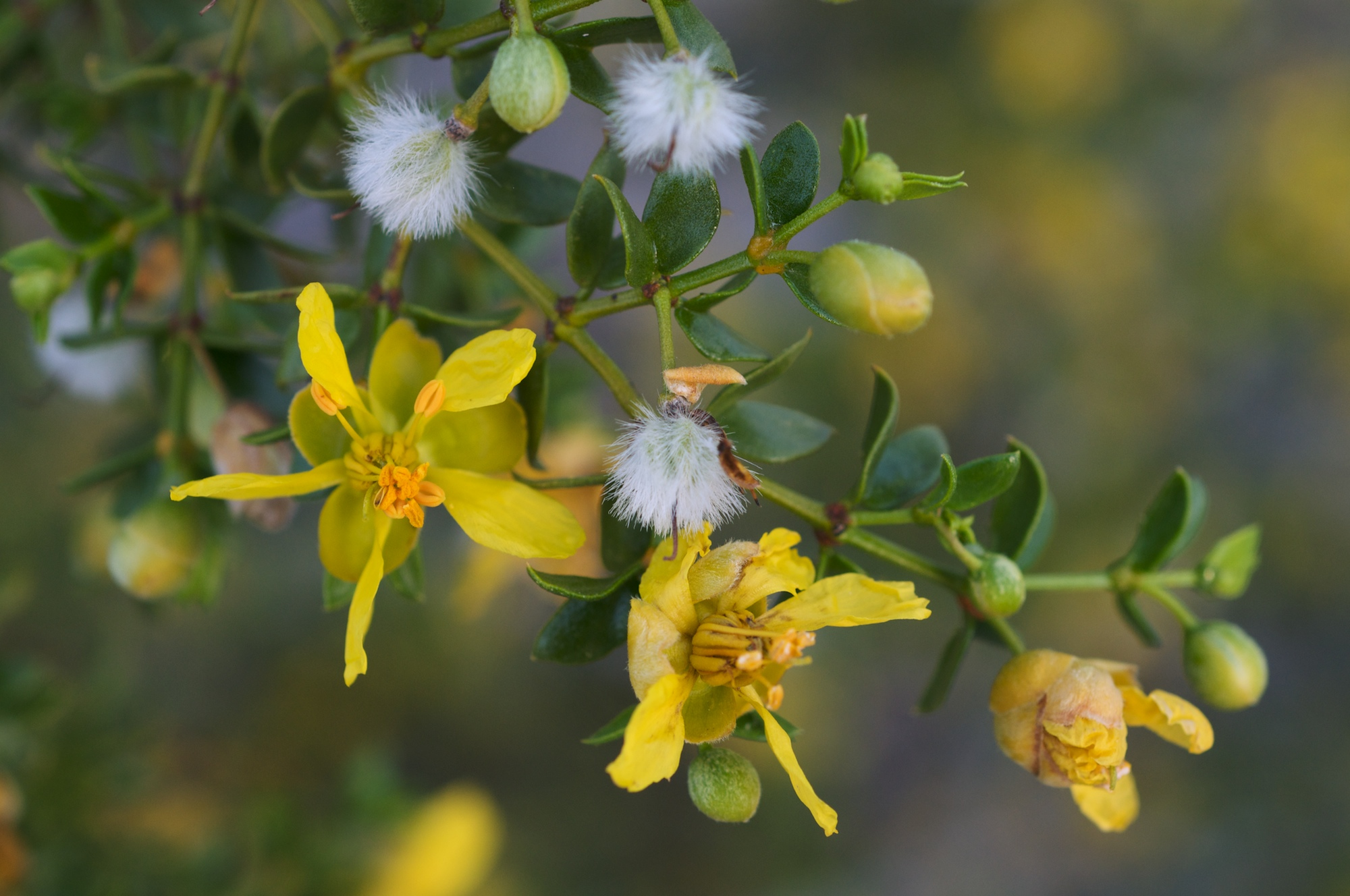
- Sprig with flower buds, flowers and fruit at Furnace Creek in Death Valley N.P.

Conservation status
- Secure (NatureServe)

Scientific classification
- Kingdom: Plantae
- Clade: Tracheophytes
- Clade: Angiosperms
- Clade: Eudicots
- Clade: Rosids
- Order: Zygophyllales
- Family: Zygophyllaceae
- Genus: Larrea
- Species: L. tridentata

Binomial name
- Larrea tridentata (DC.) Coville
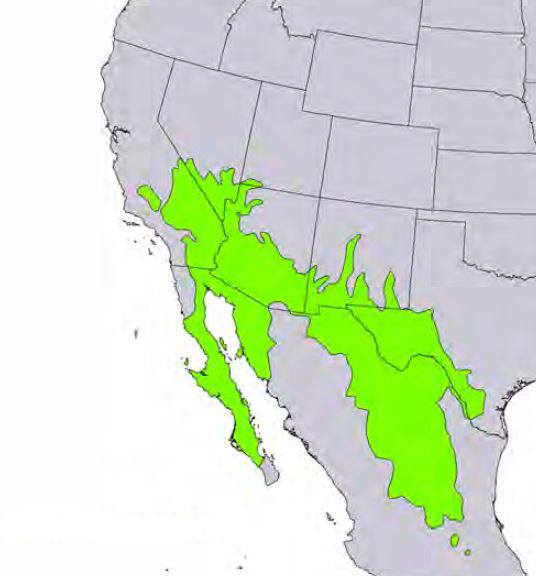
- natural range

Synonyms
- Synonymy: Covillea glutinosa (Engelm.) Rydb.; Covillea tridentata (DC.) Vail; Guaiacum mexicanum Baill.; Larrea divaricata var. arenaria (L.D.Benson) Felger; Larrea divaricata subsp. tridentata (DC.) Felger; Larrea glutinosa Engelm.; Larrea mexicana Moric.; Larrea tridentata var. arenaria L.D.Benson; Larrea tridentata var. glutinosa (Engelm.) Jeps.; Larrea tridentata subsp. glutinosa (Engelm.) A.E.Murray; Neoschroetera glutinosa (Engelm.) Briq.; Neoschroetera tridentata (DC.) Briq.; Schroeterella glutinosa (Engelm.) Briq.; Schroeterella tridentata (DC.) Briq.; Zygophyllum tridentatum DC.

= Larrea tridentata =

Creosote bush

Species of plant

Larrea tridentata, also called creosote bush, greasewood as a plant, and chaparral as a medicinal herb. In Sonora, it is more commonly called hediondilla; Spanish hediondo = "smelly". It is a flowering plant in the family Zygophyllaceae. The specific name tridentata refers to its three-toothed leaves.

== Distribution ==
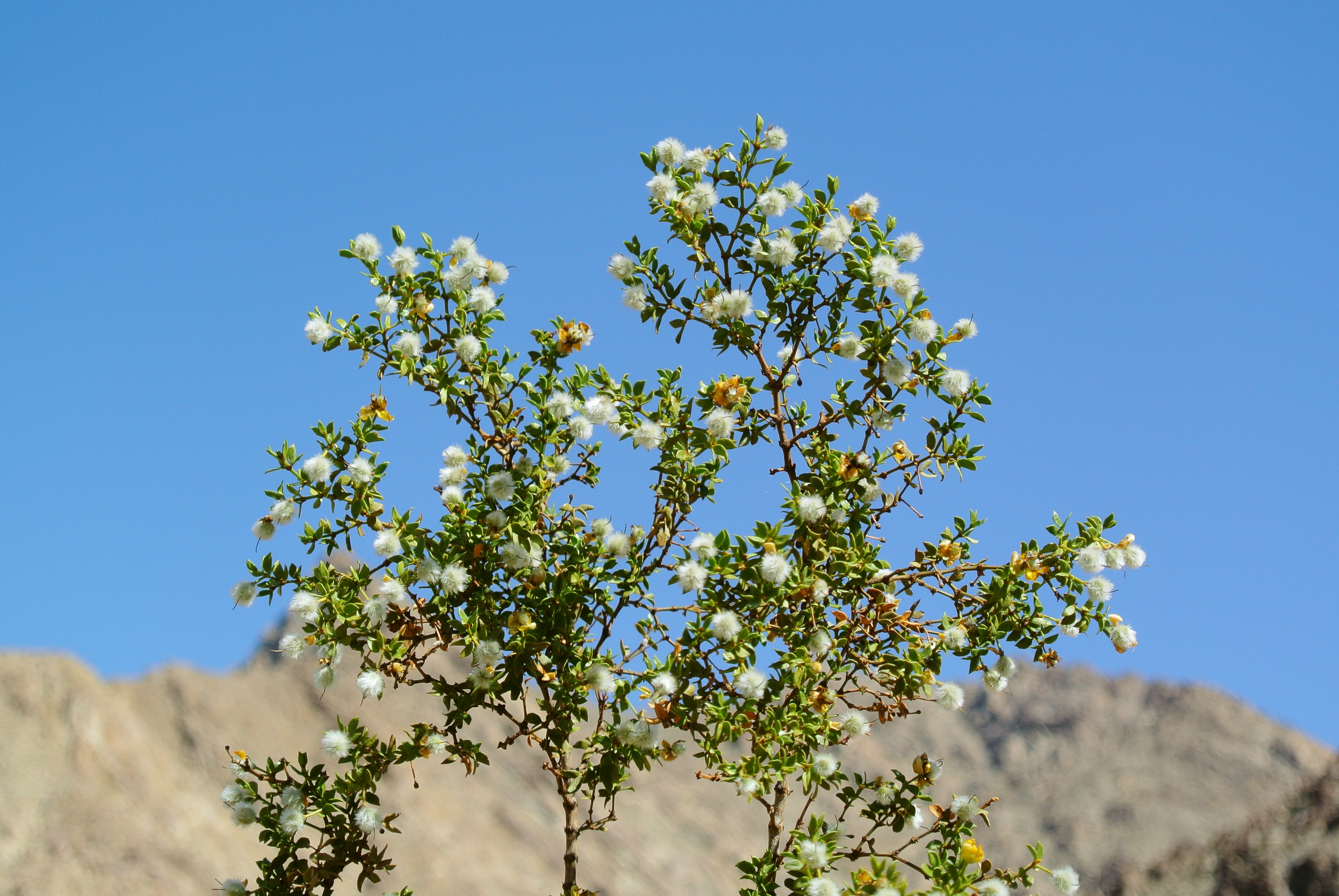
L. tridentata in Anza-Borrego Desert State Park

Larrea tridentata is a prominent species in the Mojave, Sonoran, and Chihuahuan Deserts of western North America, and its range includes those and other regions in portions of southeastern California, Arizona, southern Nevada, southwestern Utah, New Mexico, and Texas in the United States, and Chihuahua, Sonora, Coahuila, Nuevo León, Zacatecas, Durango and San Luis Potosì in Mexico. The species grows as far east as Zapata County, Texas, along the Rio Grande southeast of Laredo near the 99th meridian west.

== Description ==
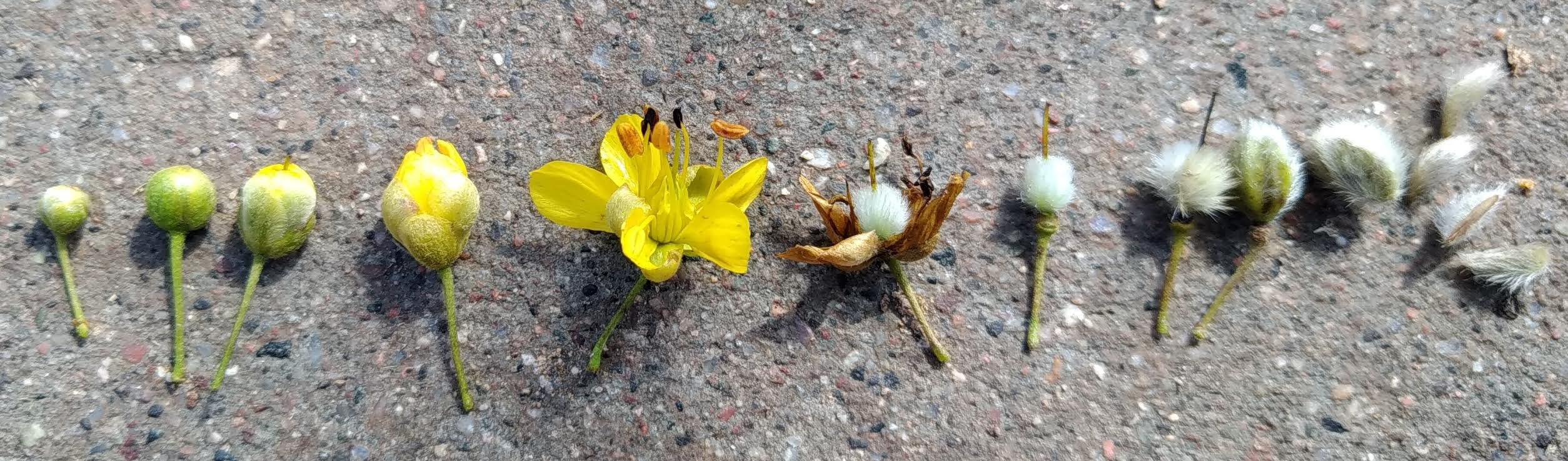
Stages of creosote flower development, from bud (left) to fruit and seeds (right)

Larrea tridentata is an evergreen shrub growing to 1 to 3 m (3 to 10 ft) tall, rarely 4 m (13 ft). The light gray stems of the plant bear resinous, dark green leaves with two opposite lanceolate leaflets joined at the base, with a deciduous awn between them, each leaflet 7 to 18 mm (1/4 to 11/16 in) long and 4 to 8.5 mm (5/32 to 11/32 in) broad. The flowers are up to 25 mm (1 in) in diameter, with five yellow petals. The fruit is a brown-burgundy spherical, fuzzy capsule, which separates into five individual carpels each containing one seed. Galls may form by the activity of the creosote gall midge. The whole plant exhibits a characteristic odor of creosote, from which the common name derives. In the regions where it grows, its smell is often associated with the "smell of rain", as the scent of its resinous leaves intensifies in rain.

== Ecology ==
These animals eat these parts of the creosote bush:

- Leaves: Of mammals, only the jackrabbit, and only when it can find no other food, as the leaves are bitter; desert iguanas, and the chuckwalla.
- Seeds: desert woodrats and kangaroo rats
- Flowers: 22 species of bees, as pollinators, the chuckwalla, desert iguanas, etc.
- Many species of insects

The Arabian camel, brought to the area by the United States Camel Corps, readily ate creosote bush. It is thought that this meeting reestablished a biological relationship that was broken when the American camels became extinct in the Quaternary Extinction Event, making it an evolutionary anachronism.

== Oldest plants ==
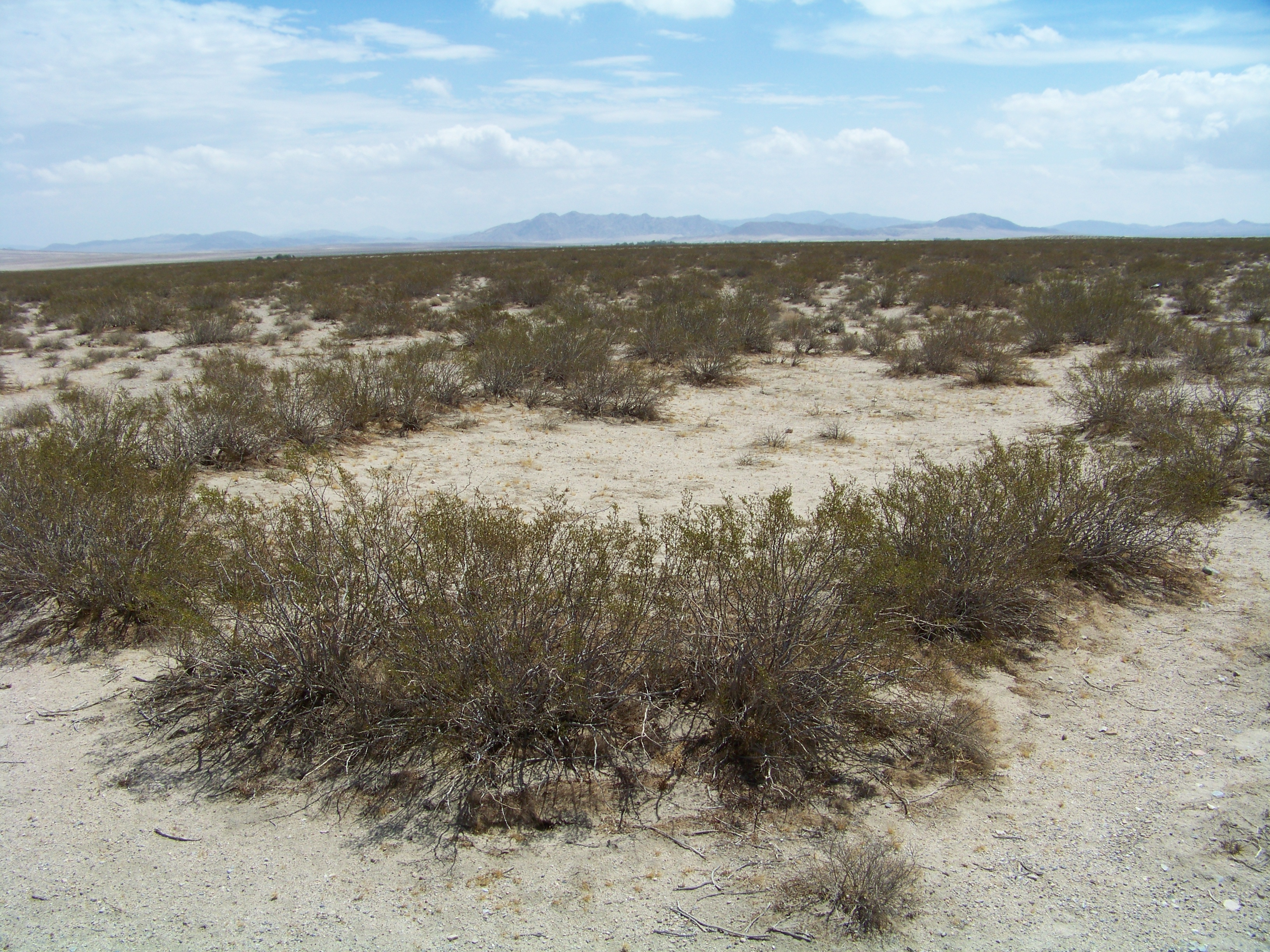
King Clone, the 11,700-year-old creosote bush ring in the Mojave Desert

As the creosote bush grows older, its oldest branches eventually die and its crown splits into separate crowns. This normally happens when the plant is 30 to 90 years old. Eventually, the old crown dies and the new ones become a clonal colony from the previous plant, composed of many separate stems all from the same seed. The cloned individuals sometimes form a "ring" around the original plant, which may no longer be visible.

=== King Clone ===
The "King Clone" creosote ring is one of the oldest living organisms on Earth. It has been alive an estimated 11,700 years, in the central Mojave Desert near present-day Lucerne Valley, California. This single clonal colony plant of L. tridentata reaches up to 20 m (67 ft) in diameter, with an average diameter of 14 m (45 ft).

King Clone was identified and its age estimated by Frank Vasek, a professor at the University of California, Riverside. Measurements of the plant, as well as radiocarbon dating of wood fragments, were used to determine the plant's mean annual growth rate outward from the center of the ring. By measuring the diameter of the ring, its total age could be estimated. It is within the Creosote Rings Preserve of the Lucerne Valley and Johnson Valley.

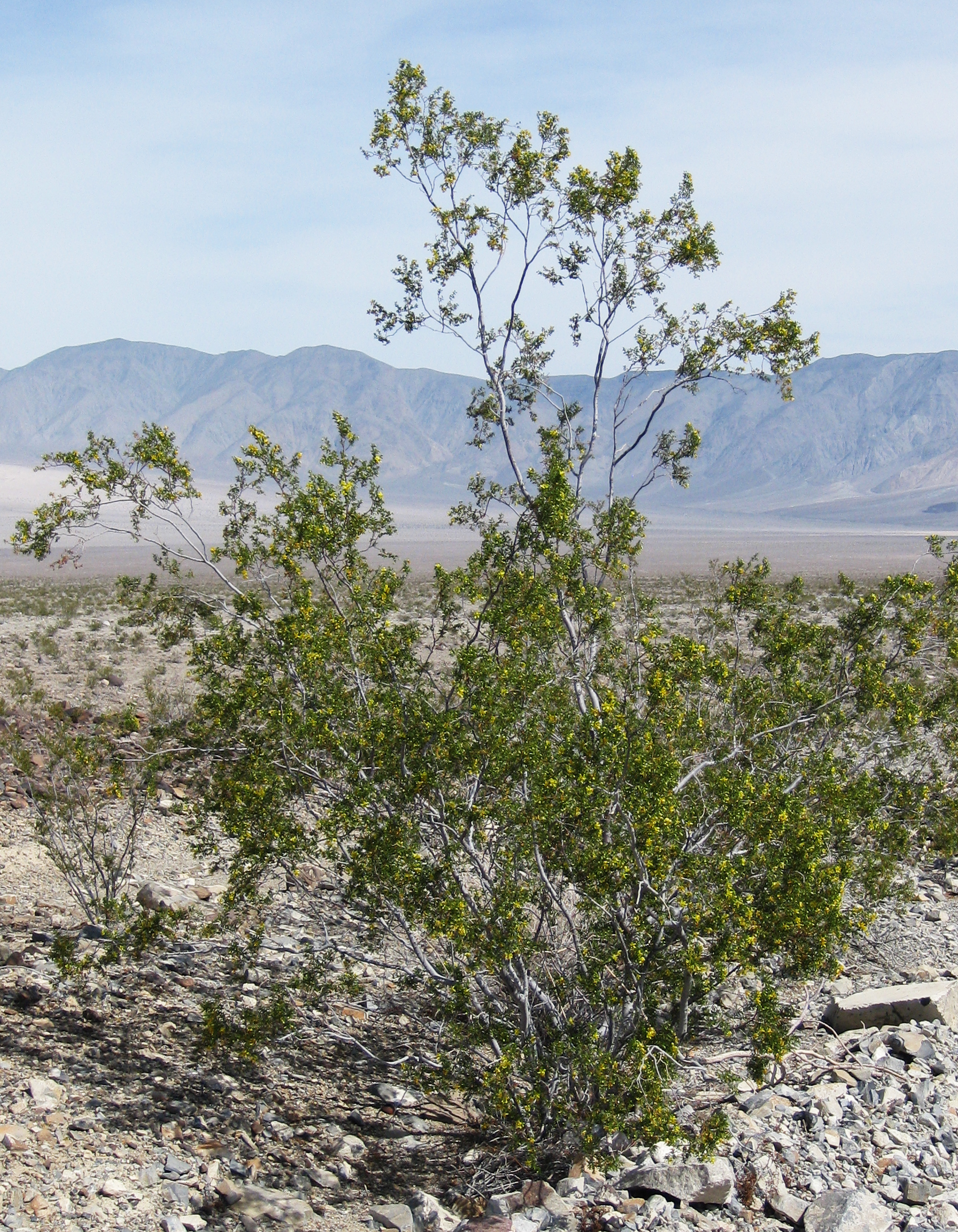
Large creosote bush, Death Valley

== Habitat ==
Creosote bush is most common on the well-drained soils of alluvial fans and flats. In parts of its range, it may cover large areas in practically pure stands, though it usually occurs in association with Ambrosia dumosa (burro bush or bur-sage). Chemicals found in creosote bush roots have been shown to inhibit the growth of burro bush roots, but as of 2013, much of their relationship remains unexplained.

Creosote bush stands tend to display an evenly spaced distribution of plants. Originally, it was assumed that the plant produced a water-soluble inhibitor that prevented the growth of other bushes near mature, healthy bushes. Now, however, it has been shown that the root systems of mature creosote plants are simply so efficient at absorbing water that fallen seeds nearby cannot accumulate enough water to germinate, effectively creating dead zones around every plant.

== Desert adaptation ==
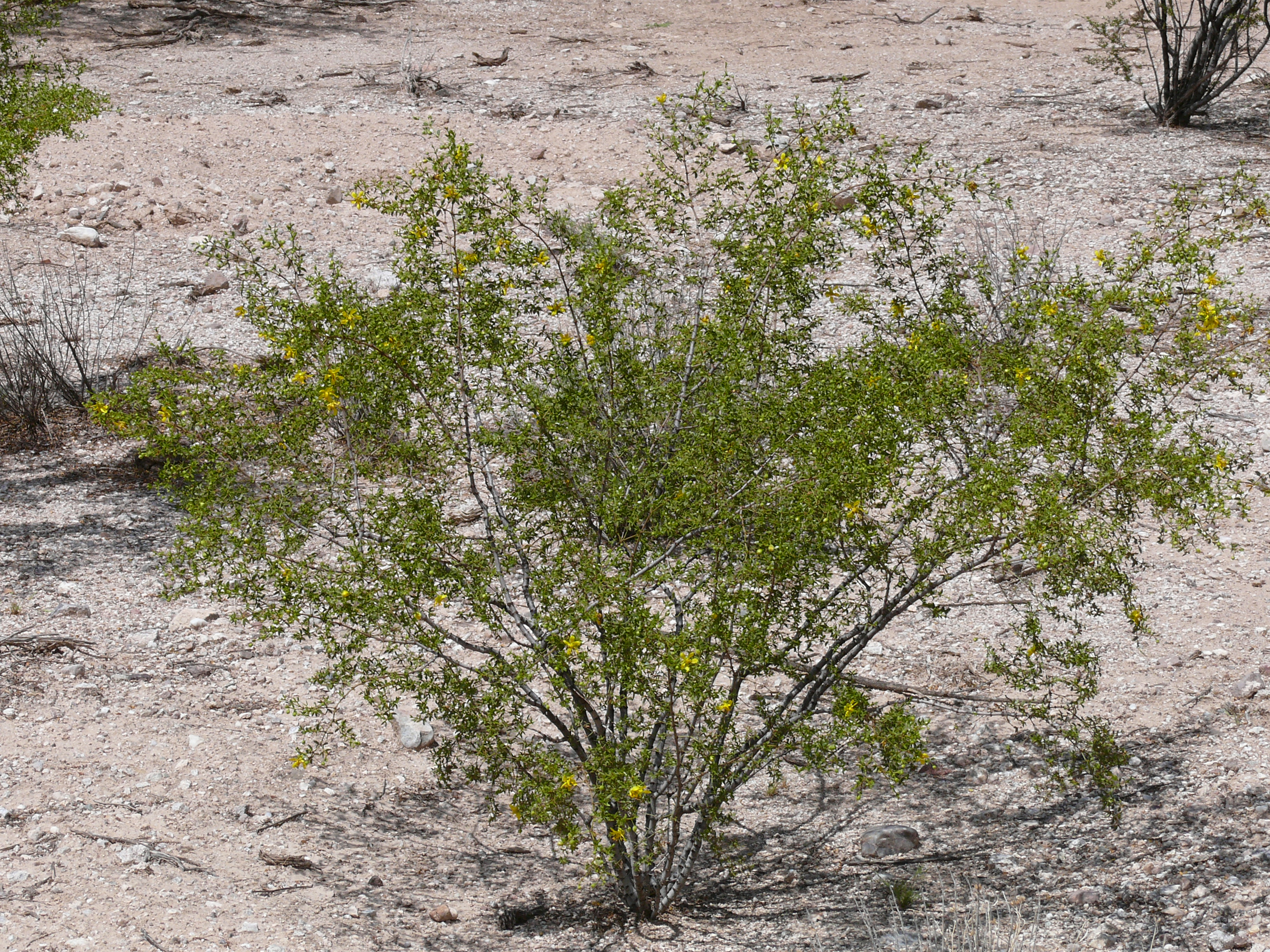
A young L. tridentata plant

Owing to the harshness of the germination environment above mature root systems, young creosote bushes are much more susceptible to drought stress than established plants. Germination is quite active during wet periods, but most of the young plants die very quickly unless water conditions are optimal. Ground heat compounds the young plants' susceptibility to water stress, and ground temperatures can reach upwards of 70 °C (160 °F). To become established, the young plant apparently must experience three to five years of abnormally cool and moist weather during and after germination. From this, it can be inferred that all the plants inside a stand are of equal age.

Mature plants, however, can tolerate extreme drought stress. In terms of negative water potential, creosote bushes can operate fully at −50 bars of water potential and have been found living down to −120 bars, although the practical average floor is around −70 bars, where the plant's need for cellular respiration generally exceeds the level that the water-requiring process of photosynthesis can provide. Cell division can occur during these times of water stress, and new cells commonly quickly absorb water after rainfall. This rapid uptake causes branches to grow several centimeters at the end of a wet season.

Water loss is reduced by the resinous waxy coating of the leaves, and by their small size, which prevents them from heating above air temperature (which would increase the vapor pressure deficit between the leaf and the air, thus increasing water loss). Plants drop some leaves heading into summer, but if all leaves are lost, the plant will not recover. Accumulation of fallen leaves, as well as other detritus caught from the passing wind, creates an ecological community specific to the creosote bush canopy, including beetles, millipedes, pocket mice, and kangaroo rats.

== Uses ==
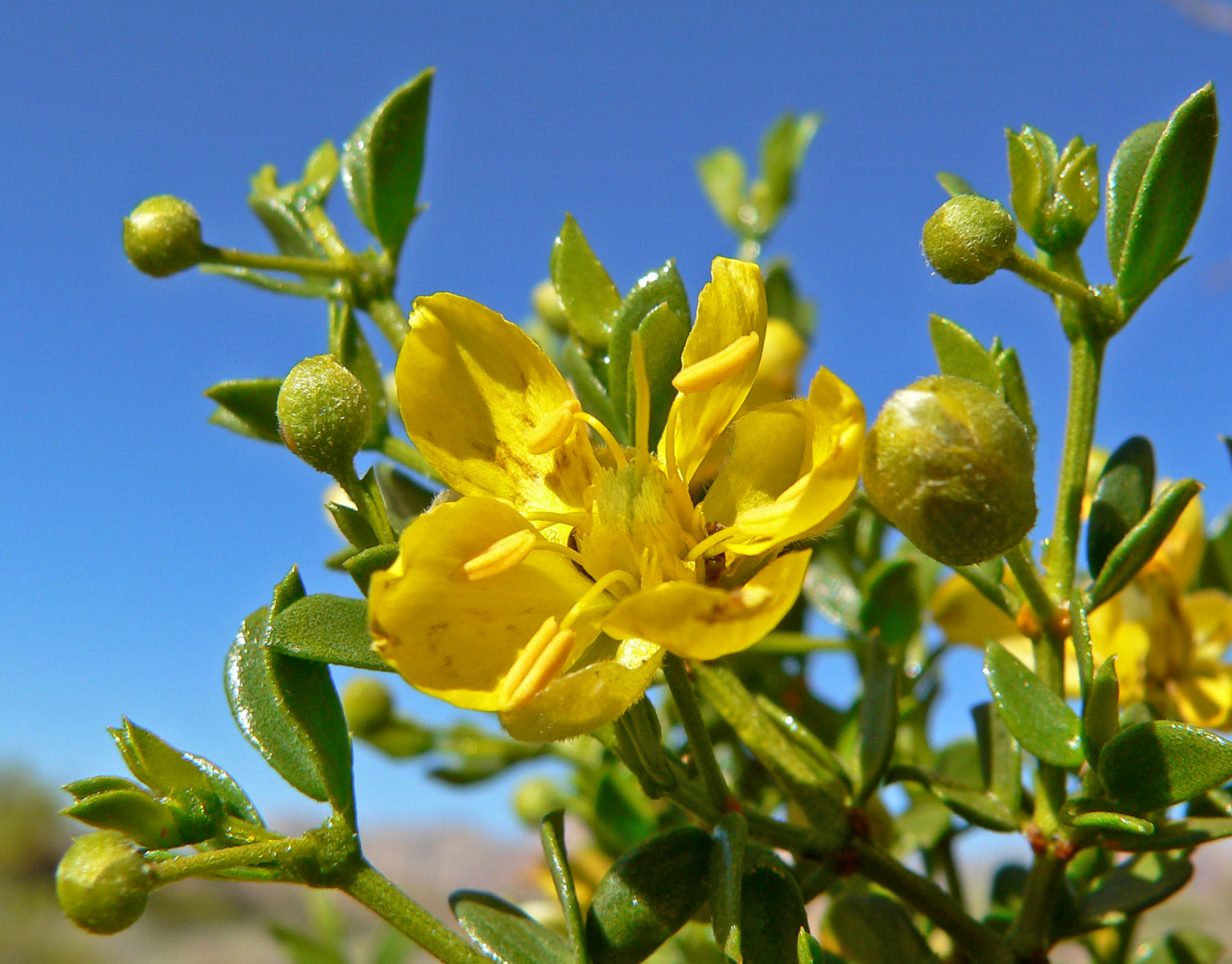
An L. tridentata flower

=== Native American medicinals ===
Native Americans in the Southwest held beliefs that it treated many maladies, including sexually transmitted diseases, tuberculosis, chicken pox, dysmenorrhea, and snakebite. The Coahuilla Indians used the plant for intestinal complaints and tuberculosis. The Pima drank a decoction of the leaves as an emetic, and applied the boiled leaves as poultices to wounds or sores. Tohono O'odham Indians prepared it medicinally for stiff limbs, snake bites, and menstrual cramps. The shrub is still widely used as a herbal medicine in Mexico.

In other uses, the reddish-colored lac that exudes from the plant was used by the Tohono O'odham, after boiling, to make a mending glue on broken pottery.

=== Herbal supplements and toxicity ===
Larrea tridentata is often referred to as chaparral when used as a herbal remedy and supplement; however, it does not grow in the synonymous plant community chaparral. The United States Food and Drug Administration has issued warnings about the health hazards of ingesting chaparral or using it as an internal medicine, and discourages its use internally. In 2005, Health Canada issued a warning to consumers to avoid using the leaves of Larrea species because of the risk of damage to the liver and kidneys.

Cancer Research UK states: "We don't recommend that you take chaparral to treat or prevent any type of cancer."

== See also ==
- Jurupa Oak – Exceptionally old clonal oak colony in Riverside, California
- List of longest-living organisms
