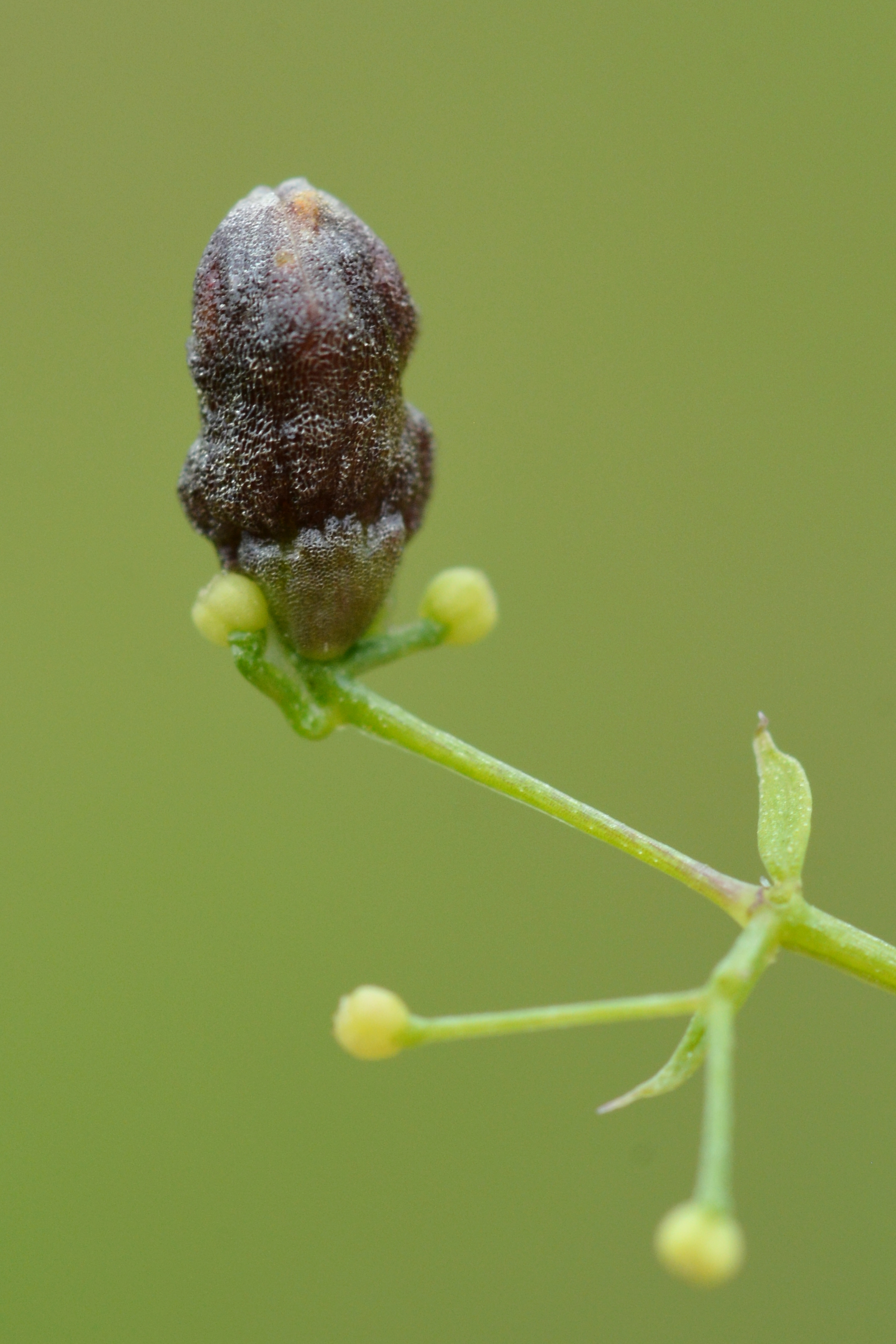
- S. galiorum gall on Galium verum.
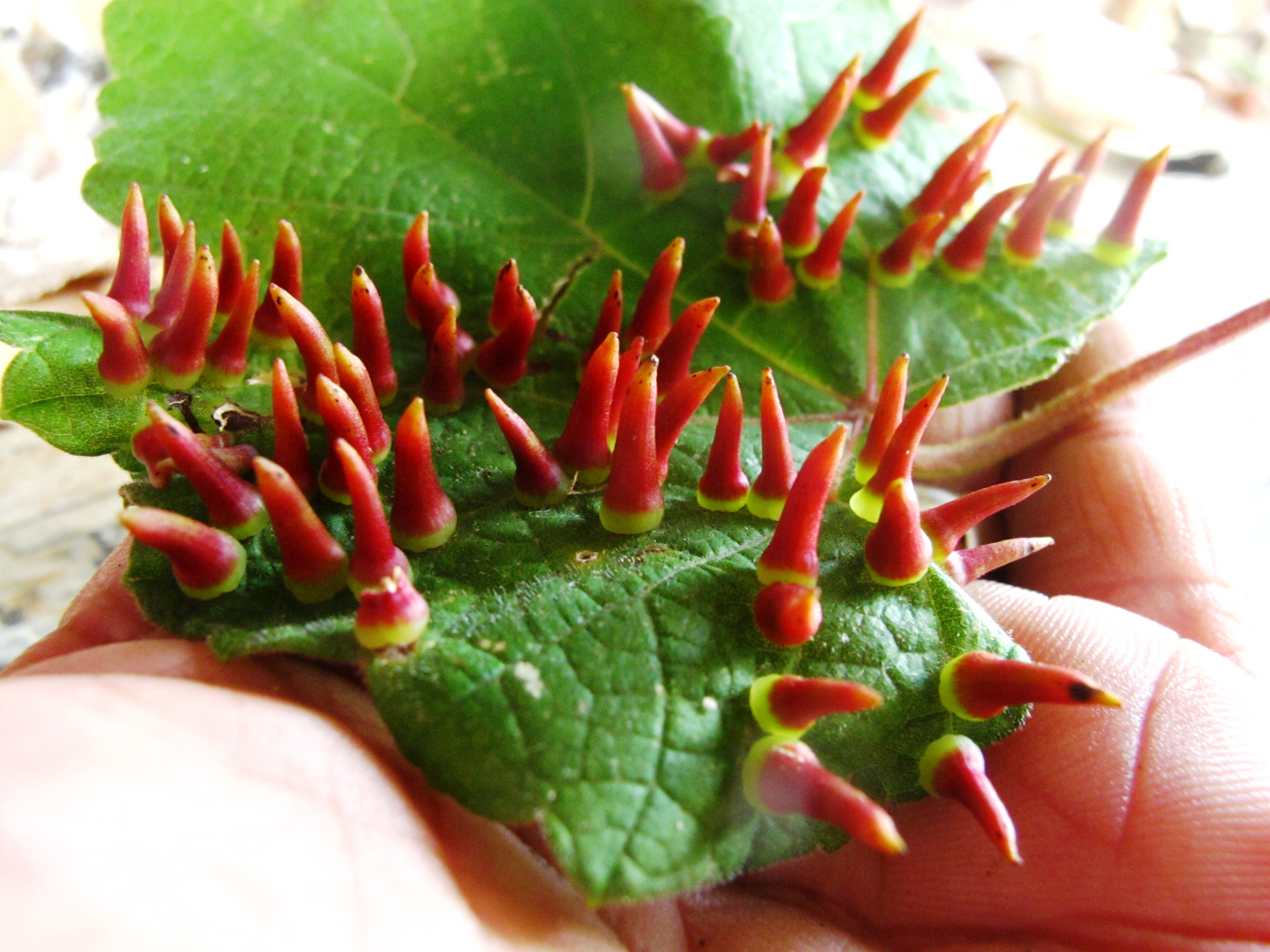
- S. viticola galls on Vitis sp.

Scientific classification
- Domain: Eukaryota
- Kingdom: Animalia
- Phylum: Arthropoda
- Class: Insecta
- Order: Diptera
- Family: Cecidomyiidae
- Supertribe: Asphondyliidi
- Tribe: Asphondyliini
- Subtribe: Schizomyiina
- Genus: Schizomyia; Kieffer, 1889

Type species
- Schizomyia galiorum Kieffer, 1889

Diversity
- Approximately 55 species

Synonyms
- Paraschizomyia Möhn, 1961

= Schizomyia =

Genus of flies

Schizomyia is a genus of gall midges. It has a cosmopolitan distribution.

This genus is in the tribe Schizomyiina of the tribe Asphondyliini of the family Cecidomyiidae.

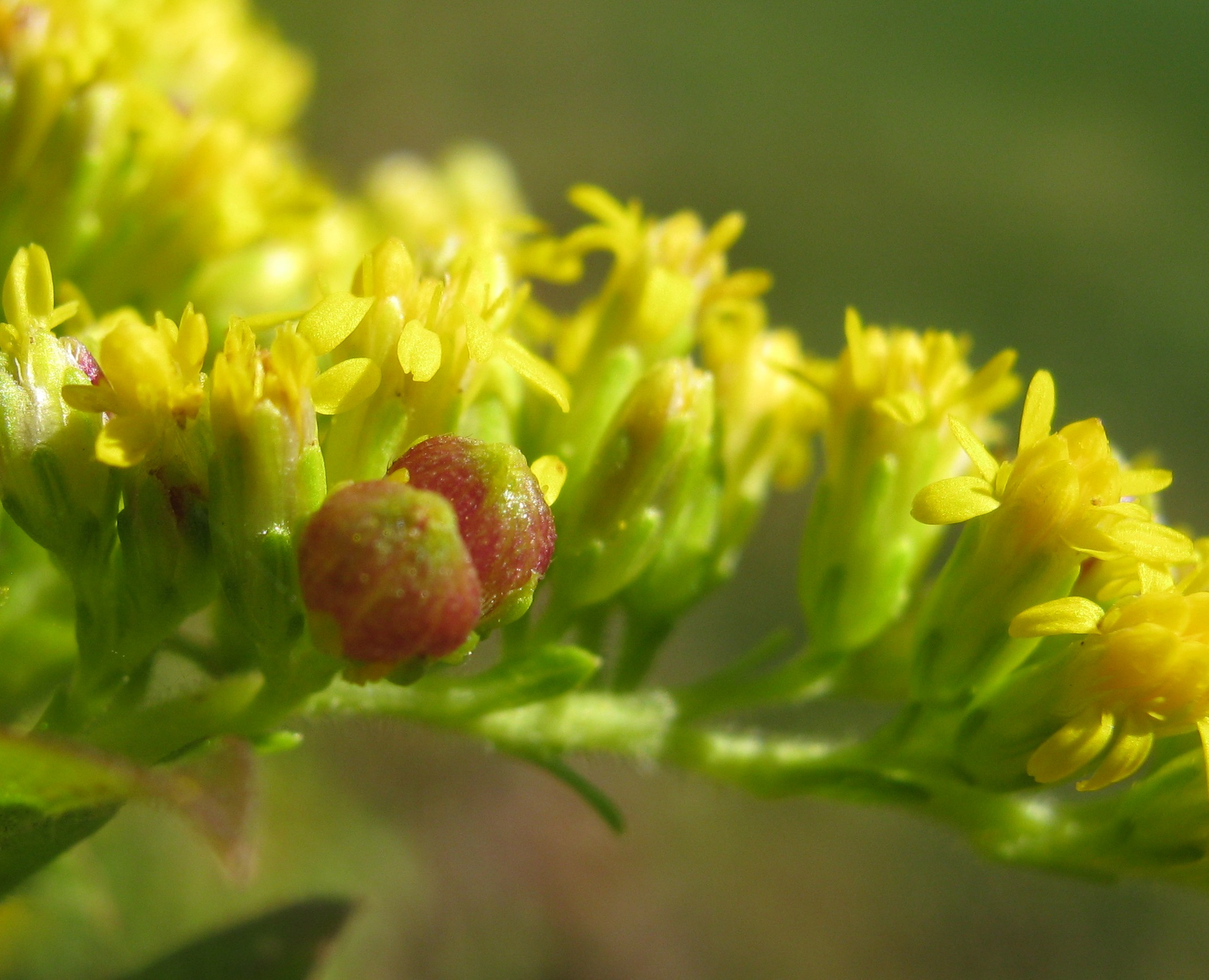
S. racemicola galls

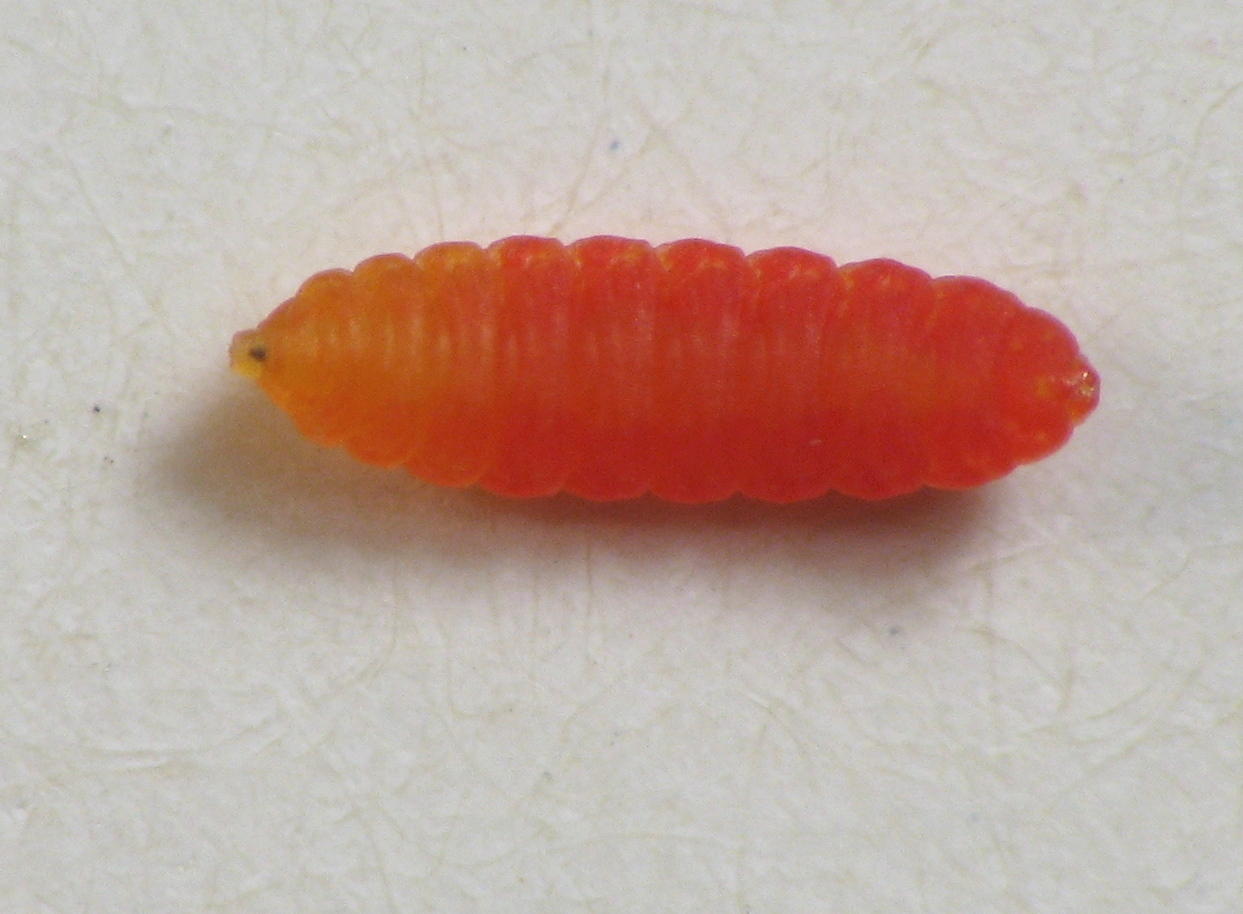
S. racemicola larva

== Species ==
These 51 species belong to the genus Schizomyia:

- Schizomyia acaciae Mani, 1934^{c g}
- Schizomyia acalyphae Felt, 1918^{c g}
- Schizomyia altifila (Felt, 1907)^{i c g}
- Schizomyia assamensis Felt, 1920^{c g}
- Schizomyia botellus Dorchin & Freidberg^{g}
- Schizomyia caryaecola Felt, 1908^{i c g}
- Schizomyia castanopsisae Elsayed & Tokuda, 2018^{c g}
- Schizomyia cheriani Mani, 1936^{c g}
- Schizomyia cissusaeflorae Mani, 1986^{c g}
- Schizomyia clerodendri Mani, 1986^{c g}
- Schizomyia cocculi Mani, 1954^{c g}
- Schizomyia cryptostegiae Gagne, 1997^{c g}
- Schizomyia diplodisci Felt, 1918^{c g}
- Schizomyia ericae Rubsaamen, 1915^{c g}
- Schizomyia eupatoriflorae (Beutenmuller, 1907)^{i c g b}
- Schizomyia galiorum Kieffer, 1889^{c g} — Europe, Algeria, Kazakhstan. Hosts: Galium spp.
- Schizomyia impatientis (Osten Sacken, 1862)^{i c g b}
- Schizomyia incerta Kieffer, 1909^{c g}
- Schizomyia indica Kieffer, 1909^{c g}
- Schizomyia ipomoeae Felt, 1910^{c g}
- Schizomyia laporteae Felt, 1921^{c g}
- Schizomyia loroco Gagne, 2008^{c g}
- Schizomyia macarangae Nayar, 1953^{c g}
- Schizomyia macrocapillata Maia, 2005^{c g}
- Schizomyia macrofila (Felt, 1907)^{i c g b}
- Schizomyia maeruae Felt, 1926^{c g}
- Schizomyia manihoti Tavares, 1925^{c g}
- Schizomyia mimosae Tavares, 1925^{c g}
- Schizomyia nodosa Felt, 1921^{c g}
- Schizomyia orientalis Grover, 1966^{c g}
- Schizomyia petiolicola Felt, 1908^{i c g}
- Schizomyia psoraleae Rübsaamen, 1910^{c g}
- Schizomyia racemicola (Osten Sacken, 1862)^{i c g b}
- Schizomyia rivinae Felt, 1908^{i c g}
- Schizomyia rubi (Felt, 1907)^{i c g}
- Schizomyia samaralukensis Fedotova, 2007^{c g}
- Schizomyia scheppigi Rübsaamen, 1910^{c g}
- Schizomyia sesami Barnes, 1939^{c g}
- Schizomyia speciosa Felt, 1914^{i c g}
- Schizomyia spherica Maia & Oliveira, 2007^{c g}
- Schizomyia stachytarphetae Barnes, 1932^{c g}
- Schizomyia tami Kieffer, 1902^{c g}
- Schizomyia tuiuiu Urso-Guimaraes & de Souza Amorim, 2002^{c g}
- Schizomyia umbellicola (Osten Sacken, 1878)^{i c g}
- Schizomyia variicornis (Kieffer, 1913)^{c g}
- Schizomyia verbesinae^{b}
- Schizomyia viburni Felt, 1908^{i c g}
- Schizomyia villebrunneae Felt, 1921^{c g}

== Former species ==
- Ampelomyia viticola (Osten Sacken, 1862)^{i c g b} — Eastern Nearctic. Hosts: Vitis (grape tube gallmaker)
- Ampelomyia vitiscoryloides (Packard)^{i c g b}
- Ampelomyia vitispomum (Osten Sacken, 1878)^{i c g b}

Data sources: i = ITIS, c = Catalogue of Life, g = GBIF, b = Bugguide.net
