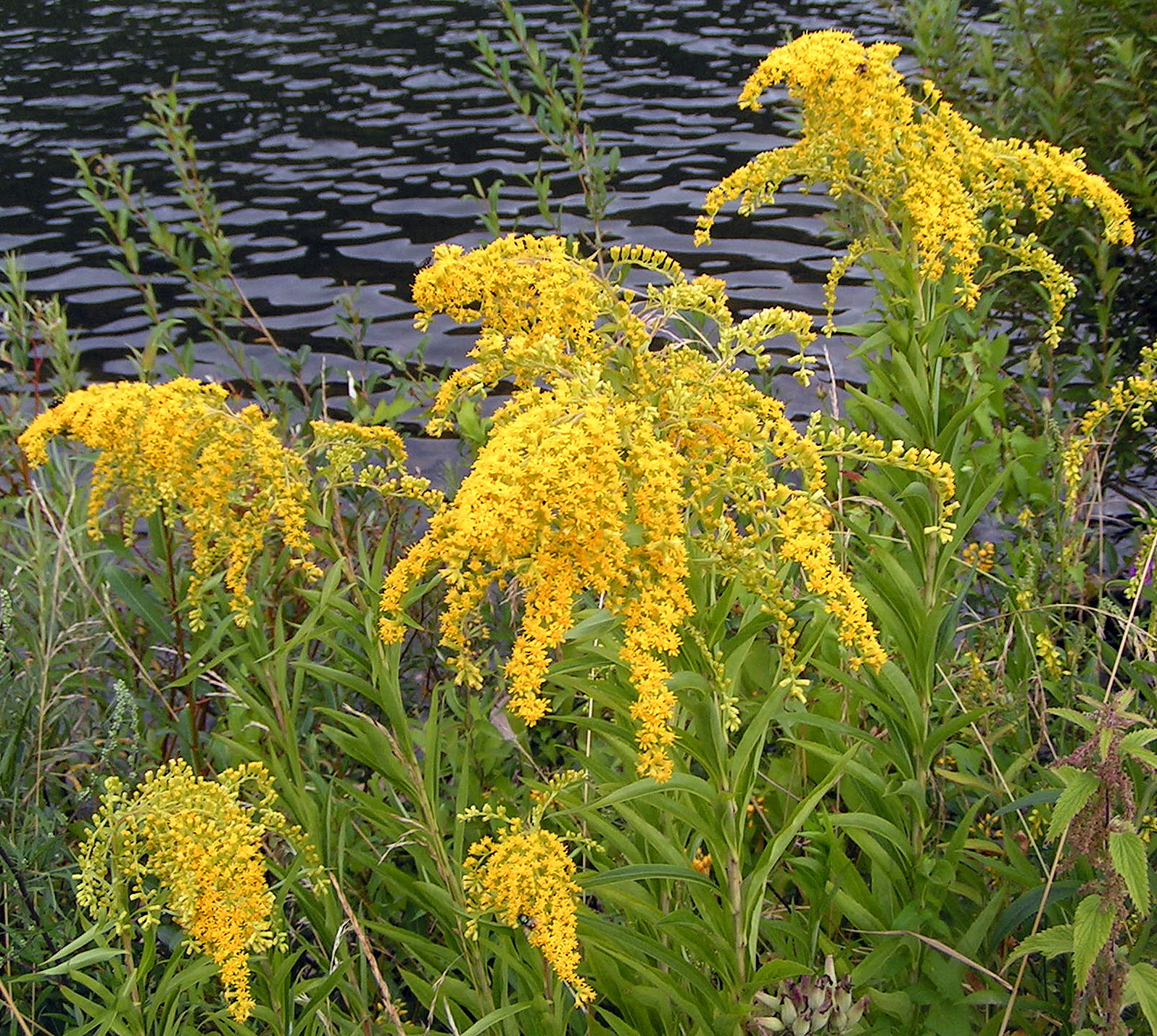

Conservation status
- Secure (NatureServe)

Scientific classification
- Kingdom: Plantae
- Clade: Tracheophytes
- Clade: Angiosperms
- Clade: Eudicots
- Clade: Asterids
- Order: Asterales
- Family: Asteraceae
- Genus: Solidago
- Species: S. gigantea

Binomial name
- Solidago gigantea Aiton

Synonyms
- Synonymy: Aster latissimifolius var. serotinus Kuntze; Doria dumerorum (Lunell) Lunell; Doria pitcheri (Nutt.) Lunell; Solidago cleliae DC.; Solidago deflexa Moench; Solidago dumetorum Lunell; Solidago fragrans A.Gray; Solidago gigantea var. leiophylla Fernald; Solidago gigantea var. pitcheri (Nutt.) Shinners; Solidago gigantea var. serotina (Kuntze) Cronquist; Solidago gigantea subsp. serotina (Kuntze) McNeill; Solidago gigantea var. shinnersii Beaudry; Solidago glabra Desf.; Solidago pitcheri Nutt.; Solidago sera J.F.Gmel.; Solidago serotina Aiton; Solidago serotina var. dumertorum (Aiton) A.Gray; Solidago serotina var. gigantea (Aiton) A.Gray; Solidago serotina f. huntingdonensis Beaudry; Solidago serotina var. minor Hook.; Solidago serotinoides Á.Löve & D.Löve; Solidago shinnersii (Beaudry) Beaudry; Solidago somesii Rydb.

= Solidago gigantea =

Species of plant native to North America

Solidago gigantea is a North American plant species in the family Asteraceae. Its common names include tall goldenrod and giant goldenrod, among others.

Goldenrod is the state flower of Kentucky and of Nebraska.

== Description ==
Solidago gigantea is a perennial herb that reaches heights of up to 2 m (6.6 ft) tall, sometimes spreading by means of underground rhizomes. It often grows in clumps with no leaves at the base but numerous leaves on the stem. At the top, each stem produces a sizable array of many small flower heads, sometimes several hundred. Each head is yellow, containing both disc florets and ray florets.

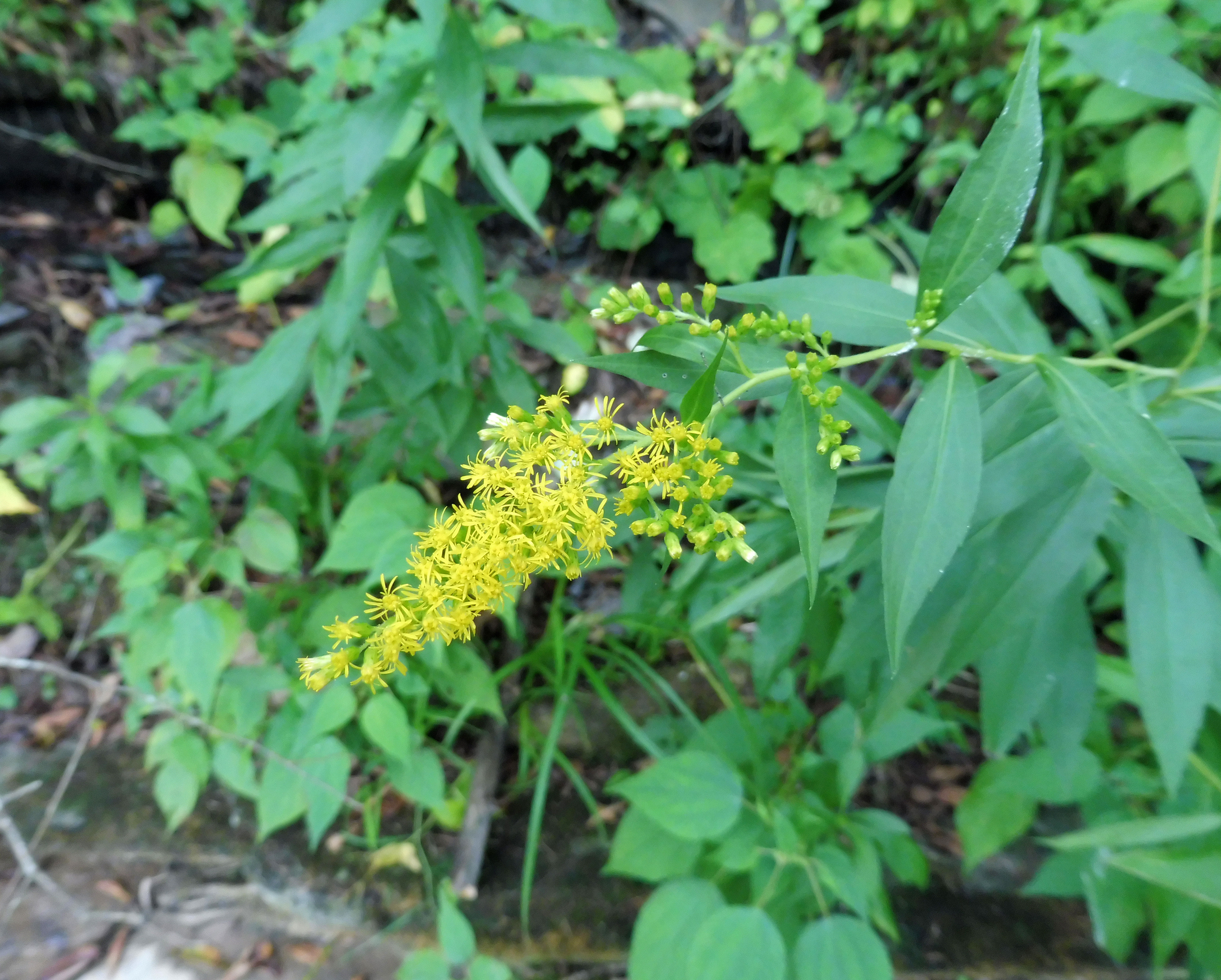
Detail of inflorescence

Achenes in November

== Habitat ==
Solidago gigantea is found in a wide variety of natural habitats, although it is restricted to areas with at least seasonally moist soils.

== Distribution ==
It is a widespread species known from most of non-arctic North America east of the Rocky Mountains. It has been reported from every state and province from Alberta to Nova Scotia to Florida to Texas, and also from the state of Nuevo León in northeastern Mexico.

=== Environmental impact ===
Solidago gigantea is highly invasive throughout Europe and Asia. In its non-native range, it exerts a negative impact on native communities by decreasing species richness and diversity, apparently due to its intense competitive effects, rapid growth, or polyploidization. In the non-native European range, several management options are applied, such as periodical flooding, mowing, mulching, grazing, or herbicide to reduce the negative impact of the species on native biodiversity.

== Diseases ==
Parasitized by the Basidiomycete Coleosporium asterum.

=== Galls ===
This species is host to the following insect induced galls:

- Asphondylia rosulata Dorchin, 2015 (leaf snap)
- Asphondylia solidaginis Beutenmuller, 1907 (leaf snap)
- Asteromyia carbonifera (Osten Sacken, 1862)
- Dasineura folliculi (Felt, 1908)
- Epiblema scudderiana (Clemens, 1860)
- Eurosta solidaginis (Fitch, 1855)
- Gnorimoschema gallaesolidaginis (Fitch, 1855)
- Gnorimoschema jocelynae Miller, 2000
- Rhopalomyia capitata Felt, 1908 (spring and generations)
- Rhopalomyia inquisitor Felt, 1908
- Schizomyia racemicola (Osten Sacken, 1862)
- Tephritis pura (Loew, 1873)
- Calycomyza solidaginis Kaltenbach, 1869
