= Henry Ford Estate =

The Henry Ford Estate may refer to:

- Fair Lane, the Henry Ford Estate in Dearborn, Michigan
- Ford Winter Estate, part of the Edison and Ford Winter Estates in Fort Myers, Florida
