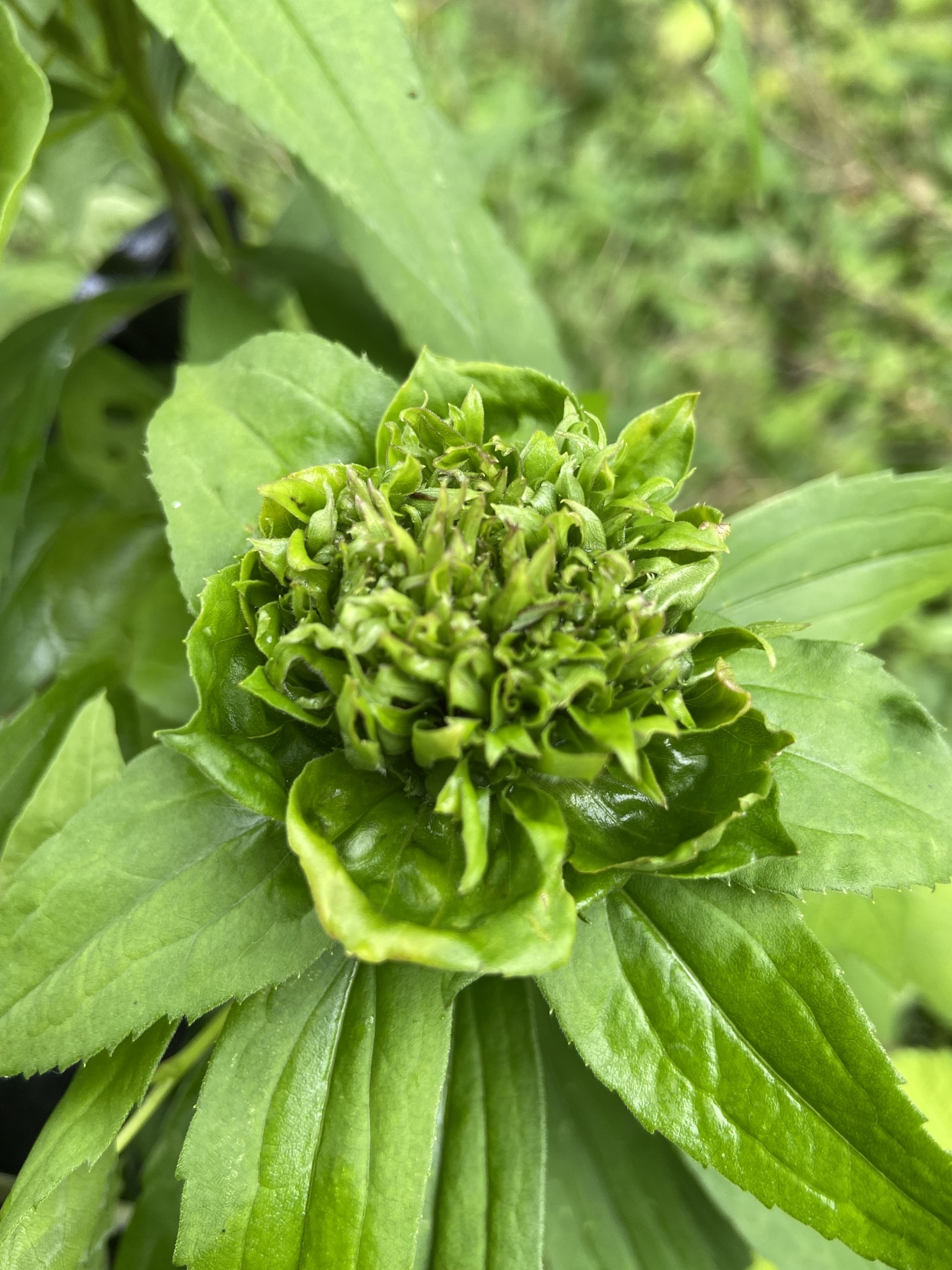
- R. capitata galls

Scientific classification
- Kingdom: Animalia
- Phylum: Arthropoda
- Class: Insecta
- Order: Diptera
- Family: Cecidomyiidae
- Supertribe: Lasiopteridi
- Tribe: Oligotrophini
- Genus: Rhopalomyia
- Species: R. capitata

Binomial name
- Rhopalomyia capitata Felt, 1908

= Rhopalomyia capitata =

Species of fly

Rhopalomyia capitata, the giant goldenrod bunch gall, is a species of gall midge in the family Cecidomyiidae. It is found across North America. They have been collected from Solidago canadensis, Solidago gigantea, and Solidago leavenworthii gallormers species page

== Gall and biology ==
This is bivoltine species that produces similar galls in both generations. The spring-generation galls occur in early to mid May in young Solidago gigantea sprouts and are located close to the ground. First instar larvae that have overwintered in the rhizomes form the early galls The galls are composed of many short and narrow leaves, with 1-8 white, conical chambers containing a single orange larva each. The central complex of short leaves is surrounded by 5-10 much longer and wider leaves, creating a star-like shape with a diameter up to 10 cm. The spring-generation galls are similar to Dasineura folliculi galls, but lack the multiple short leaves at the center and instead have several wider leaves with yellowish spots on leaves below and around the gall. The all is composed of numerous small cells and with a diameter of 2.5 cm.

Pupae of the spring galls emerge from mid to late May and induce the much slower-developing summer-generation galls that have several wide leaves surrounding dozens of densely packed, smaller leaves, giving the gall a shape of a sunflower. The summer galls contain 6-20 white, conical chambers, and larvae of R. capitata are heavily attacked by parasitoids. Some shoot tips can support larvae of both species at the same time, resulting in galls with morphological attributes of both species, and ectoparasitoids are found feeding on the larvae and pupae of the gall inducer.
