= Ampelomyia =

Scientific classification
- Domain: Eukaryota
- Kingdom: Animalia
- Phylum: Arthropoda
- Class: Insecta
- Order: Diptera
- Family: Cecidomyiidae
- Tribe: Asphondyliini
- Genus: Ampelomyia; Elsayed & Tokuda, 2019

Type species
- Ampelomyia conicocoricis Elsayed & Tokuda, 2019

Genus of flies

Ampelomyia is a genus of gall midges in the tribe Asphondyliini. It consists of the following four species, all of which form galls on grape plants:

- A. conicocoricis Elsayed & Tokuda, 2019
- A. viticola (Osten Sacken)
- A. vitiscoryloides (Packard)
- A. vitispomum (Osten Sacken)
