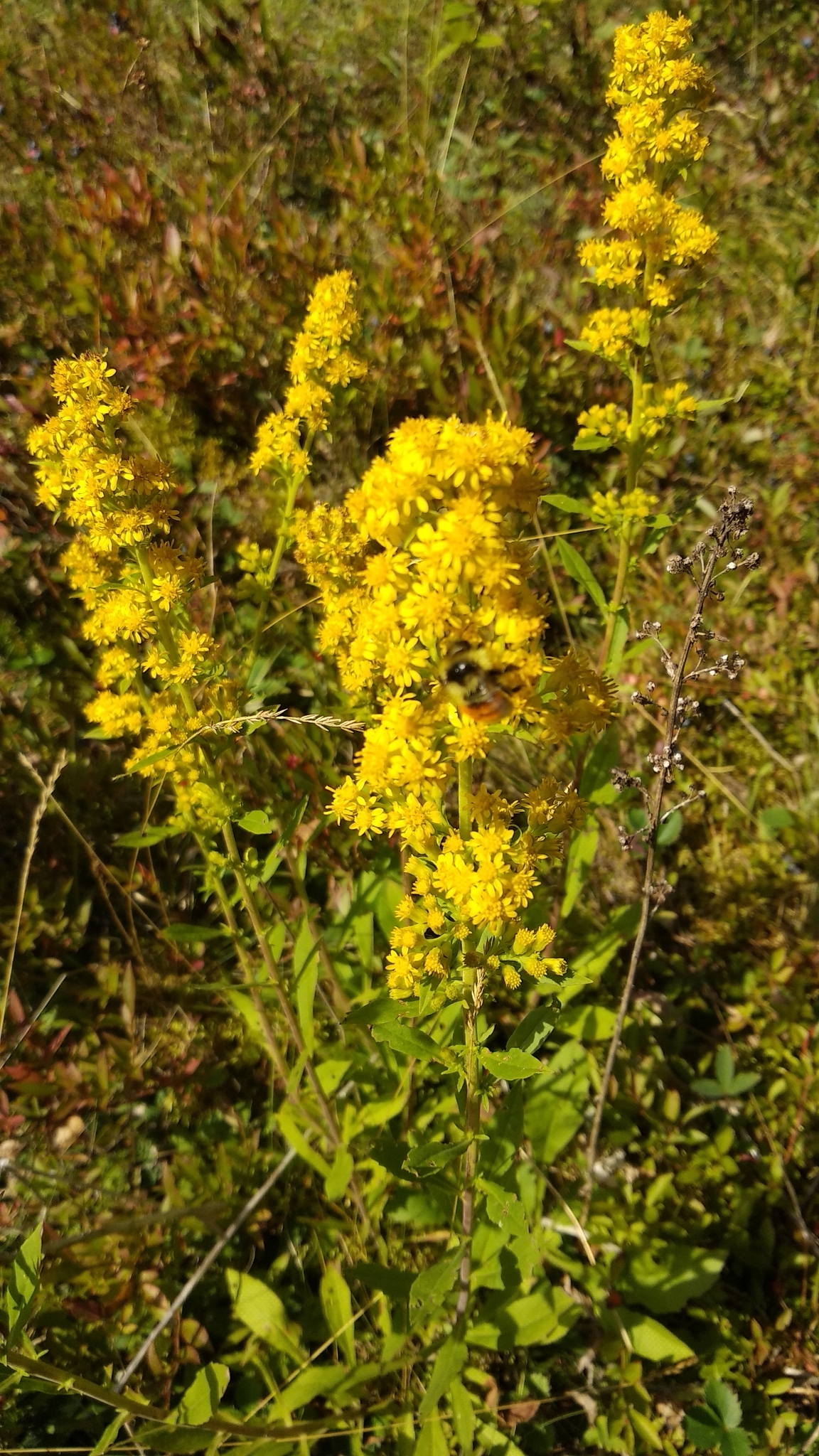

Scientific classification
- Kingdom: Plantae
- Clade: Tracheophytes
- Clade: Angiosperms
- Clade: Eudicots
- Clade: Asterids
- Order: Asterales
- Family: Asteraceae
- Genus: Solidago
- Species: S. puberula

Binomial name
- Solidago puberula Nutt.

= Solidago puberula =

Species of flowering plant

Solidago puberula, the downy goldenrod, is a plant species native to eastern North America from Nova Scotia and Ontario south to Florida and Louisiana. Two subspecies are commonly recognized:

- Solidago puberula subsp. puberula
- Solidago puberula subsp. pulverulenta

Subsp. pulverulenta has smaller but more numerous leaves, generally 50–110 leaves 10–40 mm (0.39–1.57 in) long halfway up the stem, as opposed to 10-60 leaves 40–50 mm (1.6–2.0 in) long for subsp. puberula.

Solidago puberula is a perennial herb up to 100 cm (39.5 in) tall, with a branched woody rootstock. It can have 1-5 puberulent (hairy) stems. Leaves are toothed, tapering at the tip, puberulent on both sides. Flowering heads number 15–250, in an elongate, paniculiform array. Ray flowers are yellow, 9–16 per head. Disc flowers number 6–15 per head, each up to 3 mm (0.12 in) long.

== Galls ==
This species is host to the following insect induced gall:

- Schizomyia racemicola (Osten Sacken, 1862)

external link to gallformers
