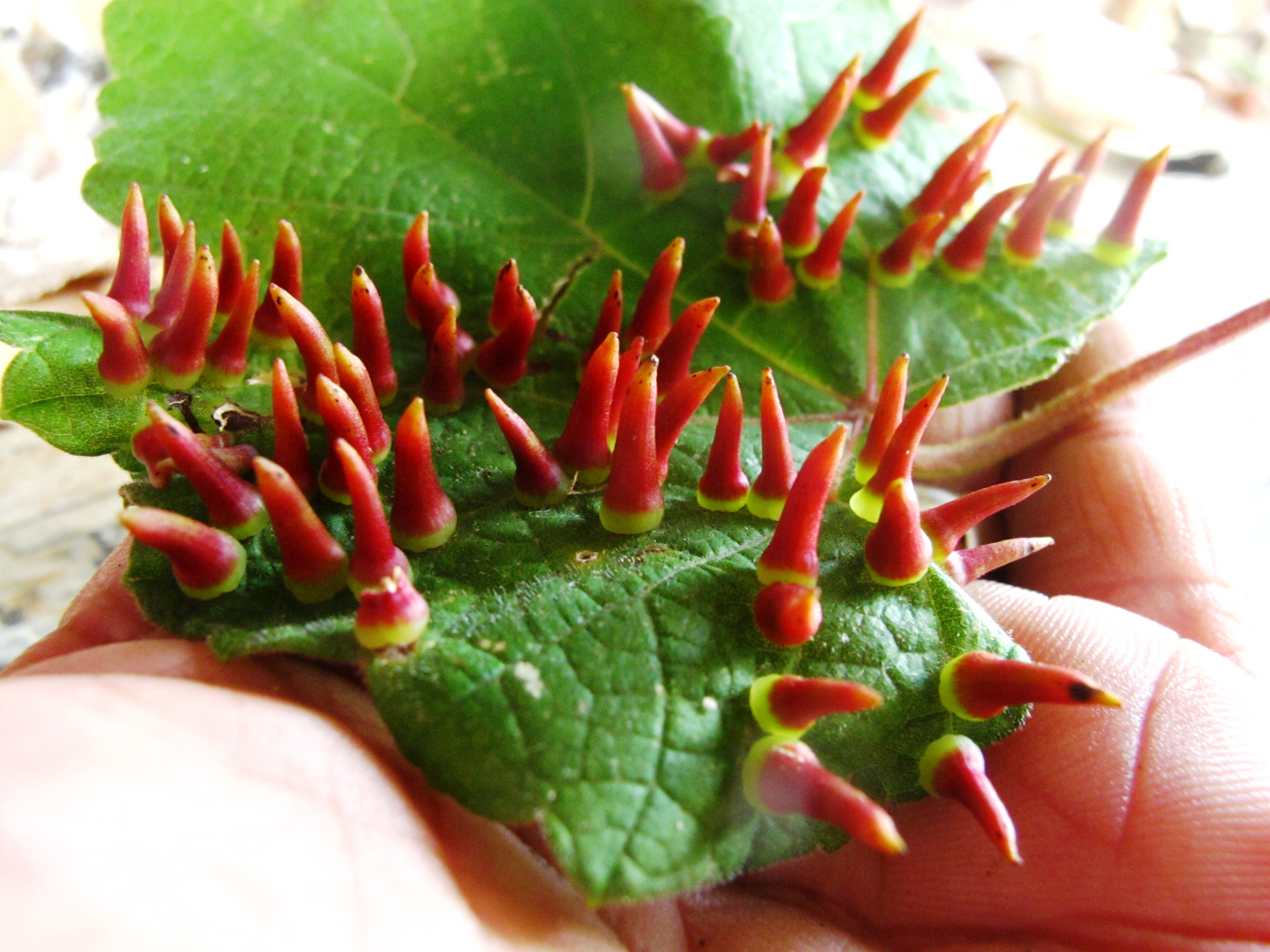
- Ampelomyia viticola galls.

Scientific classification
- Kingdom: Animalia
- Phylum: Arthropoda
- Class: Insecta
- Order: Diptera
- Family: Cecidomyiidae
- Genus: Ampelomyia
- Species: A. viticola

Binomial name
- Ampelomyia viticola (Osten Sacken, 1862)

Synonyms
- Cecidomyia viticola Osten Sacken, 1862; Cecidomyia vitis lituus Walsh & Riley, 1870; Cecidomyia vitislituus Osten Sacken, 1878; Cecidomyia lituus Felt, 1911; Schizomyia viticola (Osten Sacken, 1862)

= Ampelomyia viticola =

Species of fly

Ampelomyia viticola, the grape tube gallmaker, is a species of gall midge found in the eastern United States and Canada. It produces green or bright red galls on New World grape vines.

== Taxonomic history and names ==
In 1862, Carl Robert Osten-Sacken described this species, placing it in the genus Cecidomyia. He based the description on galls on Vitis and larvae found in the vicinity of Washington, D.C.

The magazine American Entomologist had a column where readers could ask for identifications. In 1869 a reader from Piermont, New York, asked the editors about the crimson galls found on a grape leaf. The editors, Benjamin Dann Walsh and Charles Valentine Riley, responded that in unpublished manuscripts of theirs they had given the galls the name Vitis lituus and noted they were made by a gall gnat in the genus Cecidomyia. This would create a specific name Cecidomyia vitis lituus, which is an unavailable name. In 1911, Ephraim Porter Felt incorrectly referred to this species as "Cecidomyia lituus Walsh", In 1878, Osten-Sacken noted that "the gall Vitis-lituus Riley" was the same as his C. viticola. In 2019, this species was transferred from Schizomyia to the new genus Ampelomyia.

The specific epithet viticola is a Latin noun in apposition; it consists of the word vitis "grape vine" and the suffix -cola "one who inhabits". The Latin noun lituus used in its synonyms refers to a kind of curved staff or curved trumpet.

== Distribution ==
It is found throughout the eastern Nearctic. The type locality is the "environs of Washington [DC]".

A. viticola has been documented in the following American states:

- Alabama
- Connecticut
- Indiana
- Iowa
- Missouri
- Nebraska
- New Jersey
- New York
- Ohio
- Pennsylvania
- Virginia

This species has also been documented in Ontario, Canada.

There had been reports of this species being found in Japan, but these are now taken to be misidentifications.

== Description ==
=== Gall ===
There can be up to 75 galls or even 135 galls on a single leaf. The galls are typically on the upper side of the leaf; their color is typically crimson, although they can be green when young or on the leaf's underside. They measure approximately 7–10 millimetres (0.3–0.4 in) long. The diameter of the gall at its base is 1.5–3 mm (0.06–0.12 in). They are narrow and conical, and sometimes have a slight curve at the tip. The galls each contain a single chamber, which is smooth inside. Common names for the gall include the grape-leaf trumpet-gall, the conical grape gall, and the grape tube gall.

=== Larvae ===
The larva measures about 1 mm (0.04 in) long. It is moderately stout, pale yellowish green. Its head is broad, broadly rounded anteriorly, almost subglobose. The antennae are moderately long, stout, and biarticulate; the basal segment is disk-like, while the apical one has a length over twice its diameter. There are conspicuous brownish spots near the latero-posterior angles of the head. Its skin is smooth with distinct segmentation. The breast-bone is weakly chitinized, minute, and reniform. The anterior margin has two small submedian teeth and more laterally there is a pair of smaller teeth. A small scattering of setae occur on the body. Its posterior extremity is bilobed: the ventral portion bears stout, submedian, chitinous, upcurved processes, and each has an indistinct basal tooth anteriorly. The extremities at its posterior extremity are prehensile. The dorsal lobe is broad and obliquely truncate as seen from the side. The face is armed with an irregular series of moderately large, conical, chitinous teeth.

The larvae have also been described as pale orange.

=== Adult ===
The adult is reportedly microscopic in size.

== Relationship with plants ==
Its larvae build galls on various species of the grape vine genus Vitis. They have been found on leaves of V. riparia, V. labrusca, and V. vulpina. Its galls have also been found on V. aestivalis var. bicolor. The galls are present in July and August, although have been documented as late as September 8.

These galls are usually rare in vineyards, and therefore not harmful, nor are they particularly harmful towards wild plants.
