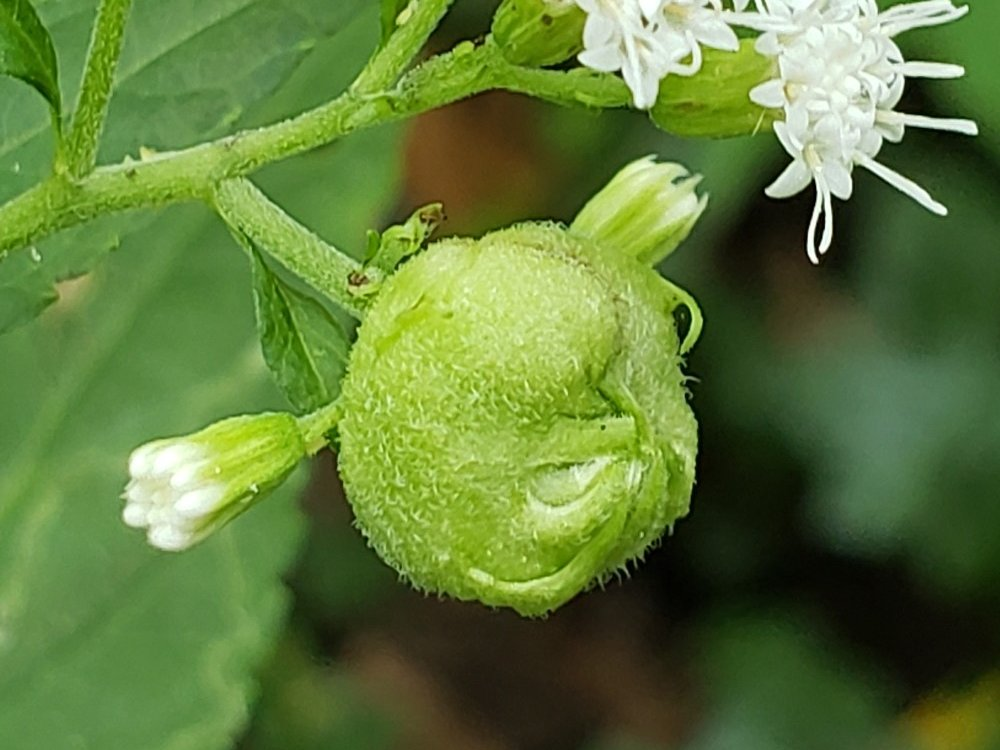

Scientific classification
- Domain: Eukaryota
- Kingdom: Animalia
- Phylum: Arthropoda
- Class: Insecta
- Order: Diptera
- Family: Cecidomyiidae
- Genus: Schizomyia
- Species: S. eupatoriflorae

Binomial name
- Schizomyia eupatoriflorae (Beutenmuller, 1907)

Synonyms
- Cecidomyia eupatoriflorae Beutenmuller, 1907

= Schizomyia eupatoriflorae =

Species of fly

Schizomyia eupatoriflorae is a species of gall midges in the family Cecidomyiidae.
