= Schizomyia macrofila =

Scientific classification
- Domain: Eukaryota
- Kingdom: Animalia
- Phylum: Arthropoda
- Class: Insecta
- Order: Diptera
- Family: Cecidomyiidae
- Genus: Schizomyia
- Species: S. macrofila

Binomial name
- Schizomyia macrofila (Felt, 1907)

Synonyms
- Asphondylia macrofila Felt, 1907

Species of fly

Schizomyia macrofila is a species of gall midges in the family Cecidomyiidae.
