= Gnorimoschema jocelynae =

Scientific classification
- Kingdom: Animalia
- Phylum: Arthropoda
- Clade: Pancrustacea
- Class: Insecta
- Order: Lepidoptera
- Family: Gelechiidae
- Genus: Gnorimoschema
- Species: G. jocelynae

Binomial name
- Gnorimoschema jocelynae Miller, 2000

Species of moth

Gnorimoschema jocelynae is a moth in the family Gelechiidae. It was described by William E. Miller in 2000. It is found in North America, where it has been recorded from Alberta, the District of Columbia, Iowa, Kentucky, Missouri, Ontario and Quebec.

The larvae feed on Solidago gigantea.
