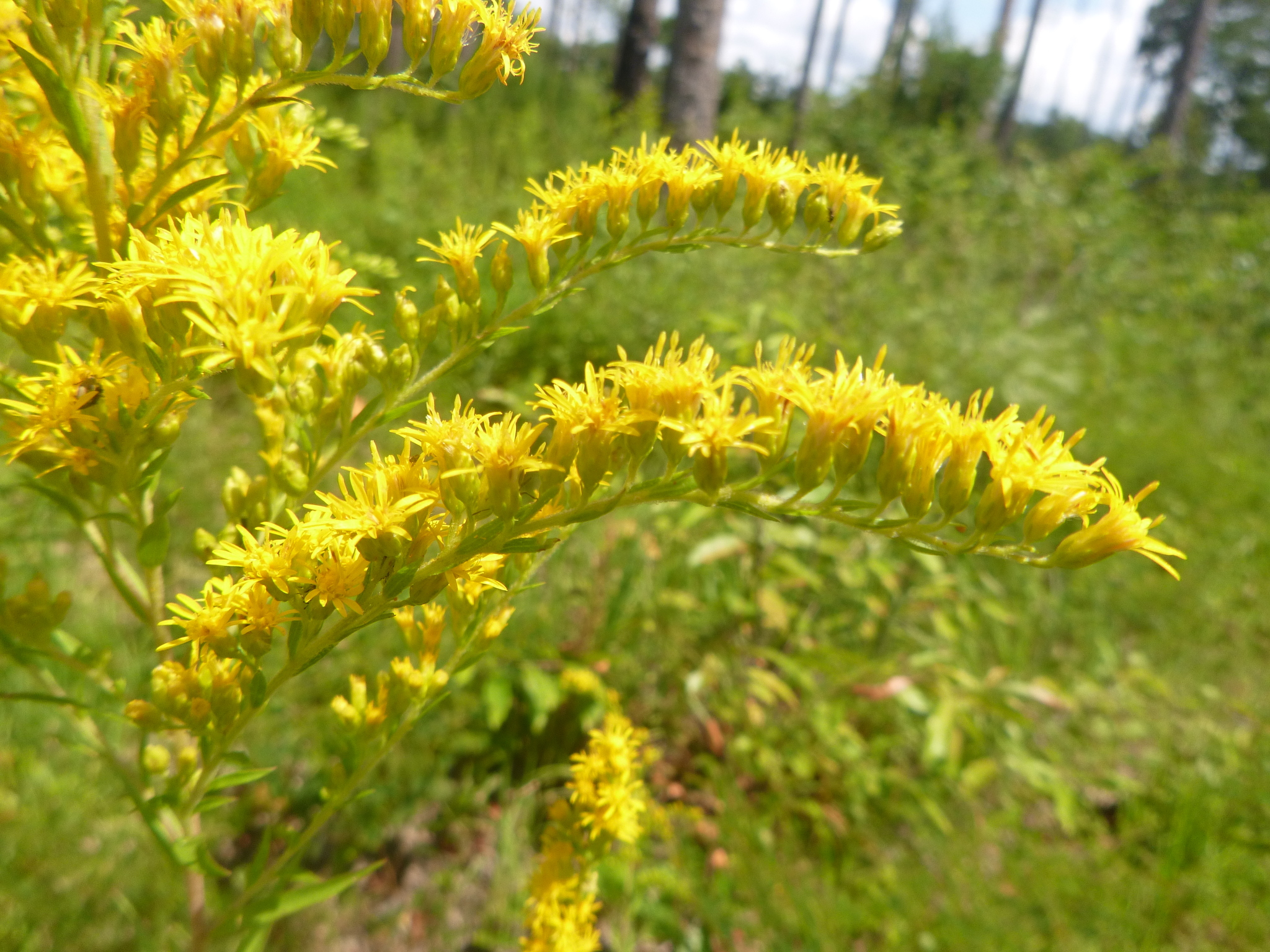

Conservation status
- Secure (NatureServe)

Scientific classification
- Kingdom: Plantae
- Clade: Tracheophytes
- Clade: Angiosperms
- Clade: Eudicots
- Clade: Asterids
- Order: Asterales
- Family: Asteraceae
- Genus: Solidago
- Species: S. leavenworthii

Binomial name
- Solidago leavenworthii Torr. & A.Gray

Synonyms
- Aster leavenworthii (Torr. & A.Gray) Kuntze

= Solidago leavenworthii =

Species of flowering plant

Solidago leavenworthii, or Leavenworth's goldenrod, is a species of herbaceous perennial plants of the family Asteraceae. It is endemic to the southeastern U.S. from Florida north to Georgia and the Carolinas.

Solidago leavenworthii is a perennial herb up to 210 cm (80 inches or 6 2/3 feet) tall, spreading by means of underground rhizomes. Leaves are crowded together, with as many as 80 leaves on one stem, though none gathered around the base of the stalk as in some related species. One plant can produce as many as 350 small yellow flower heads in a tall, branching array at the top of the plant.

The plant, which normally grows roughly 3–4 feet (90–120 cm) tall with a 5% latex yield, was adapted by Thomas Edison through cross-breeding to produce plants twice the size and with a latex yield of 12%.

== Galls ==
This species is host to the following insect induced galls:

- Rhopalomyia capitata Felt, 1908 (spring and summer generations)

external link to gallformers

== See also ==
- Edison and Ford Winter Estates § Rubber laboratory
