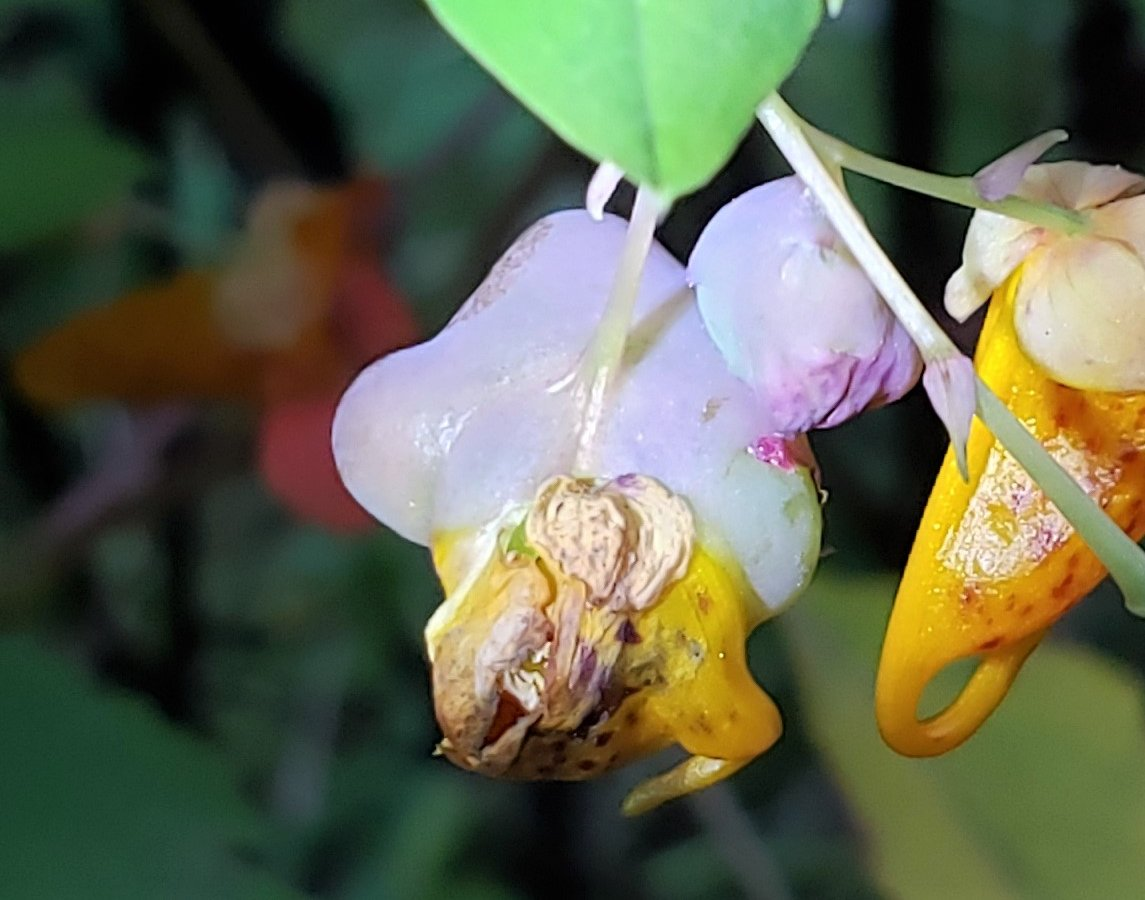

Scientific classification
- Kingdom: Animalia
- Phylum: Arthropoda
- Class: Insecta
- Order: Diptera
- Family: Cecidomyiidae
- Tribe: Asphondyliini
- Subtribe: Schizomyiina
- Genus: Schizomyia
- Species: S. impatientis

Binomial name
- Schizomyia impatientis (Osten Sacken, 1862)

Synonyms
- Cecidomyia impatientis Osten Sacken, 1862

= Schizomyia impatientis =

Species of fly

Schizomyia impatientis is a species of fly in the family Cecidomyiidae. This gall midge species induces galls on jewelweeds in eastern North America. It was first described by Carl Robert Osten-Sacken in 1862.
