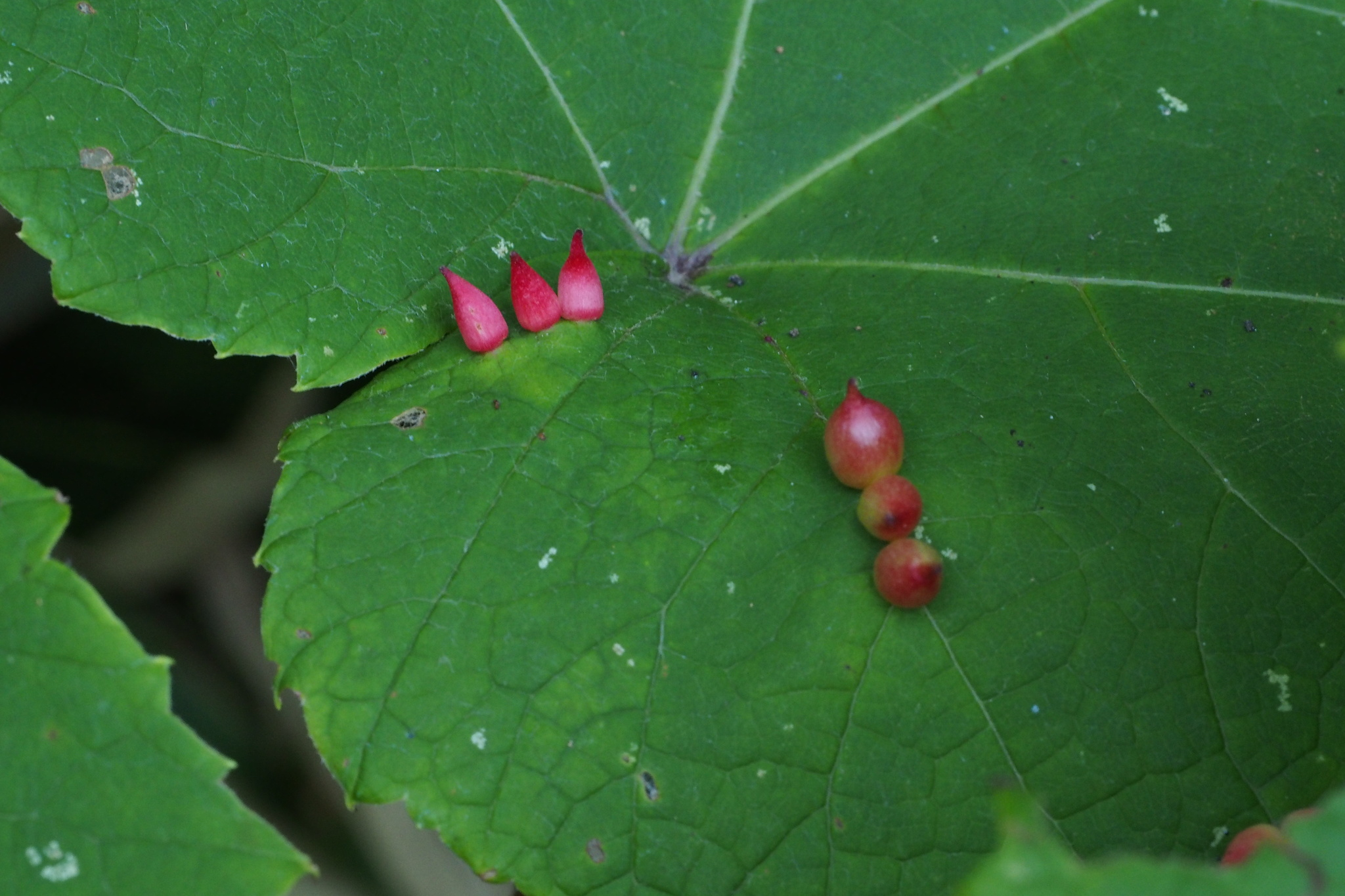
- Ampelomyia conicocoricis gall

Scientific classification
- Kingdom: Animalia
- Phylum: Arthropoda
- Class: Insecta
- Order: Diptera
- Family: Cecidomyiidae
- Genus: Ampelomyia
- Species: A. conicocoricis

Binomial name
- Ampelomyia conicocoricis Elsayed & Tokuda, 2019

= Ampelomyia conicocoricis =

Species of fly

Ampelomyia conicocoricis is a species of fly in the family Cecidomyiidae. It induces galls on grape plants in Japan. This is the type species for the genus.
