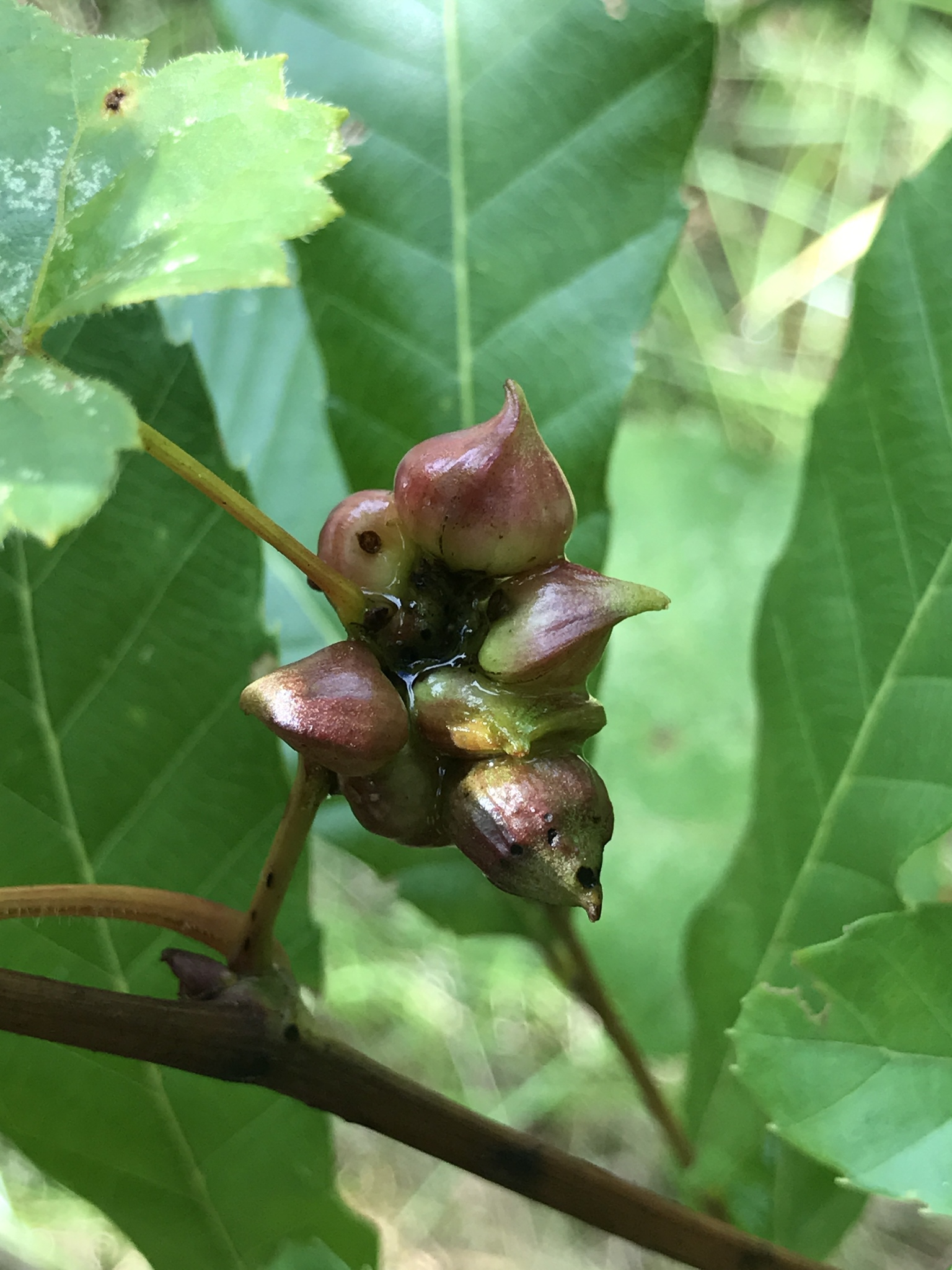
- Ampelomyia vitiscoryloides galls

Scientific classification
- Kingdom: Animalia
- Phylum: Arthropoda
- Class: Insecta
- Order: Diptera
- Family: Cecidomyiidae
- Genus: Ampelomyia
- Species: A. vitiscoryloides

Binomial name
- Ampelomyia vitiscoryloides (Packard, 1869)

Synonyms
- Cecidomyia vitiscoryloides Packard, 1869; Cecidomyia vitis coryloides Walsh & Riley, 1869; Cecidomyia coryloides Felt, 1906; Schizomyia vitiscoryloides (Packard, 1869)

= Ampelomyia vitiscoryloides =

Species of fly

Ampelomyia vitiscoryloides, the grape filbert gall midge, is a species of gall midge in the family Cecidomyiidae. It induces galls on grape plants and is widespread in eastern North America. It was first described by Alpheus Spring Packard in 1869.
