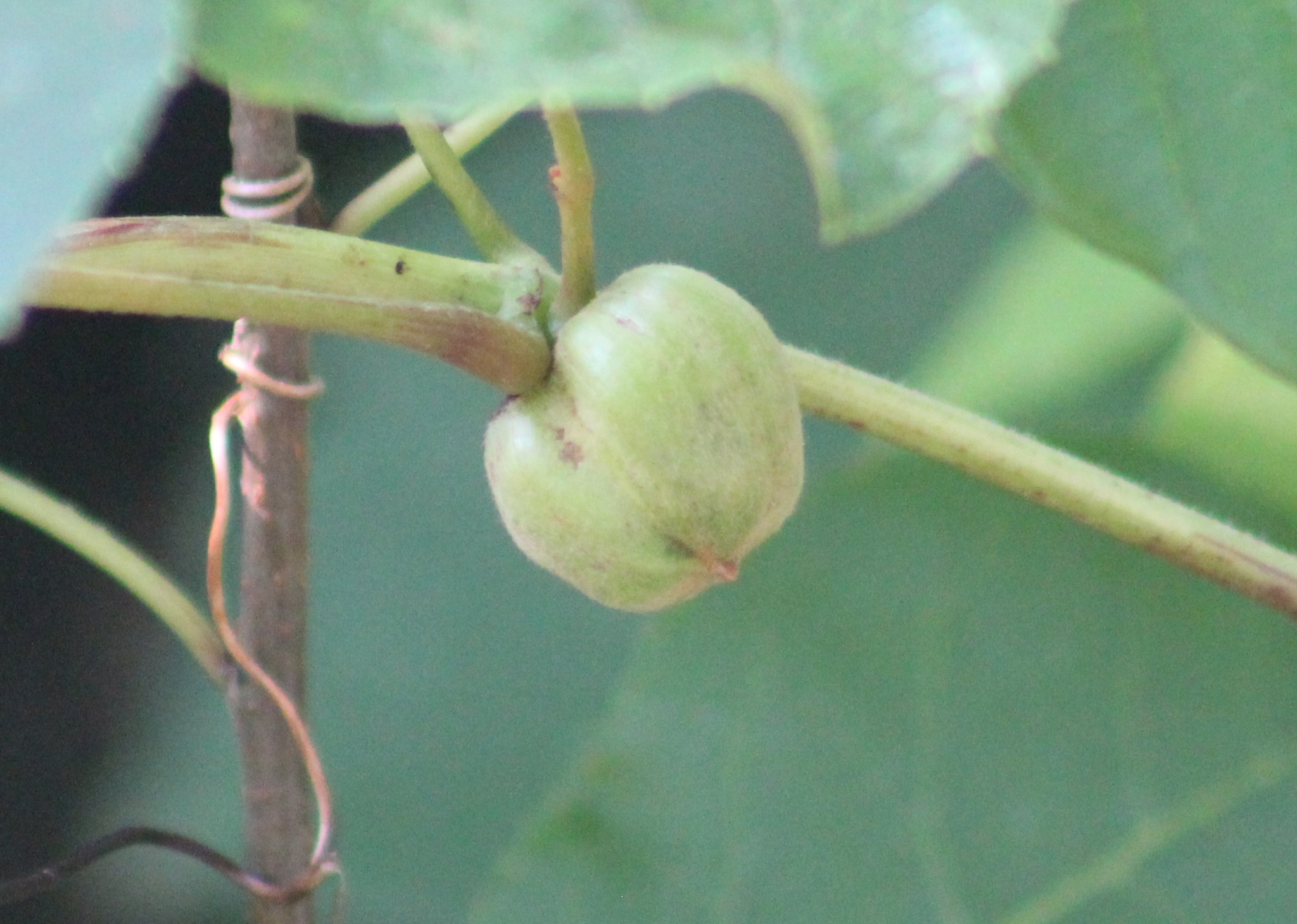
- Ampelomyia vitispomum gall

Scientific classification
- Kingdom: Animalia
- Phylum: Arthropoda
- Class: Insecta
- Order: Diptera
- Family: Cecidomyiidae
- Genus: Ampelomyia
- Species: A. vitispomum

Binomial name
- Ampelomyia vitispomum (Osten Sacken, 1878)

Synonyms
- Cecidomyia vitispomum Osten Sacken, 1878; Schizomyia pomum Felt, 1908

= Ampelomyia vitispomum =

Species of fly

Ampelomyia vitispomum is a species of gall midge in the family Cecidomyiidae. It induces galls on grape plants in eastern North America. It was first described by Carl Robert Osten-Sacken in 1878.
