= Edison and Ford Winter Estates =

Historic houses in Florida, United States

- Thomas Edison Winter Estate and Henry Ford Estate
- U.S. National Register of Historic Places
- Seminole Lodge, the Edison family's winter home

- Location within Florida Location within the United States
- Interactive map showing the location of Edison and Ford Winter Estates
- Location: Fort Myers, Florida
- Coordinates: 26°38′05″N 81°52′48″W
- Built: 1886 (Edison Estate); 1911 (Ford Estate)
- Website: Official website
- NRHP reference No.: 91001044
- Added to NRHP: September 8, 1988 (Ford Estate); August 12, 1991 (Edison Estate)

The Edison and Ford Winter Estates contain a historical museum and 21 acre (8.5 ha) botanical garden on the adjacent sites of the winter homes of Thomas Edison and Henry Ford beside the Caloosahatchee River in Southwestern Florida. It is located at 2350 McGregor Boulevard, Fort Myers, Florida.

On April 18, 2012, the American Institute of Architects' Florida Chapter placed the Edison and Ford Winter Estates on its list of Florida Architecture: 100 Years. 100 Places. The American Chemical Society recognized the Edison Botanical Research Laboratory at the Edison & Ford Winter Estates as a National Historic Chemical Landmark on May 25, 2014.

== History ==
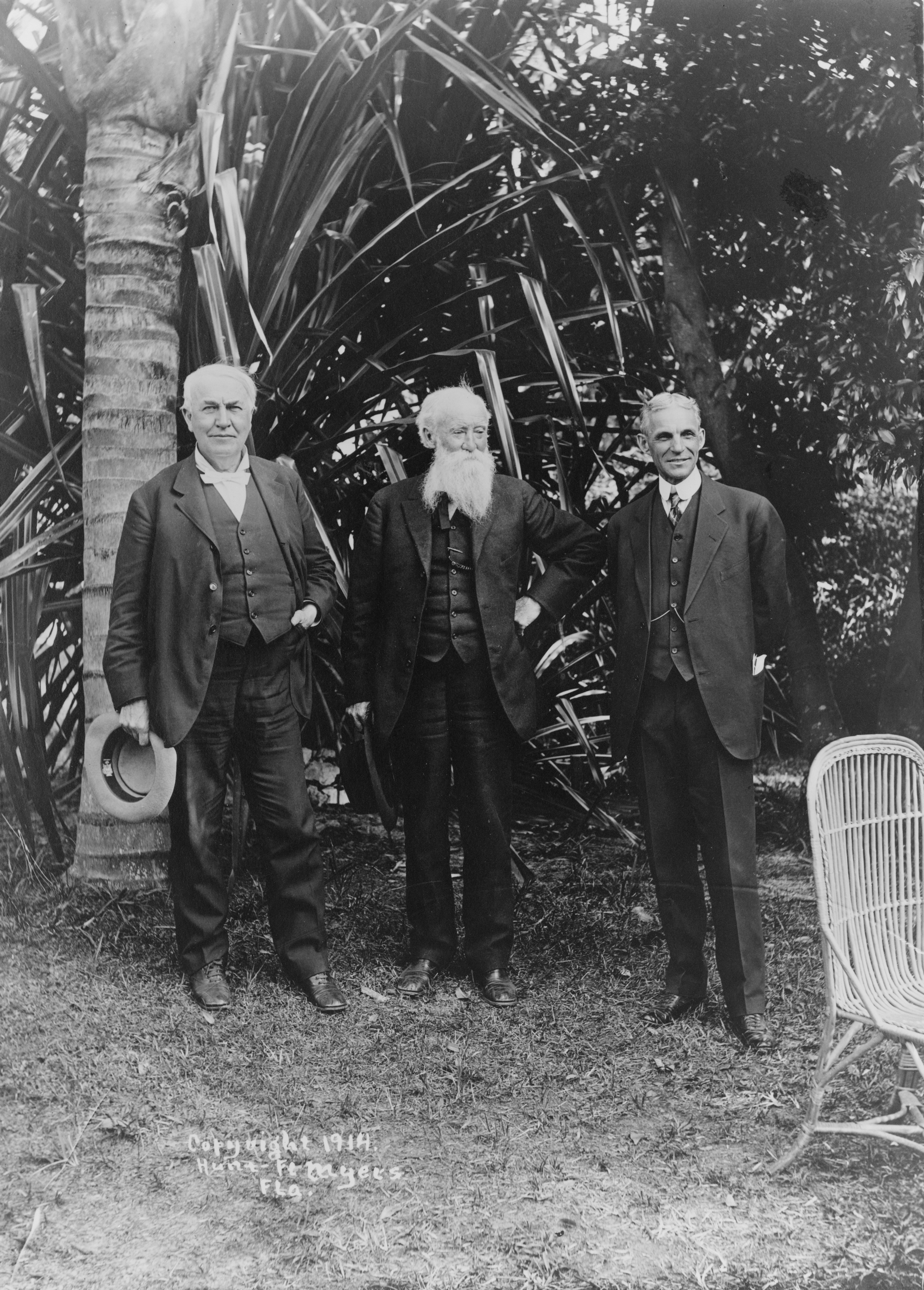
Edison, John Burroughs and Ford at the estate in 1914

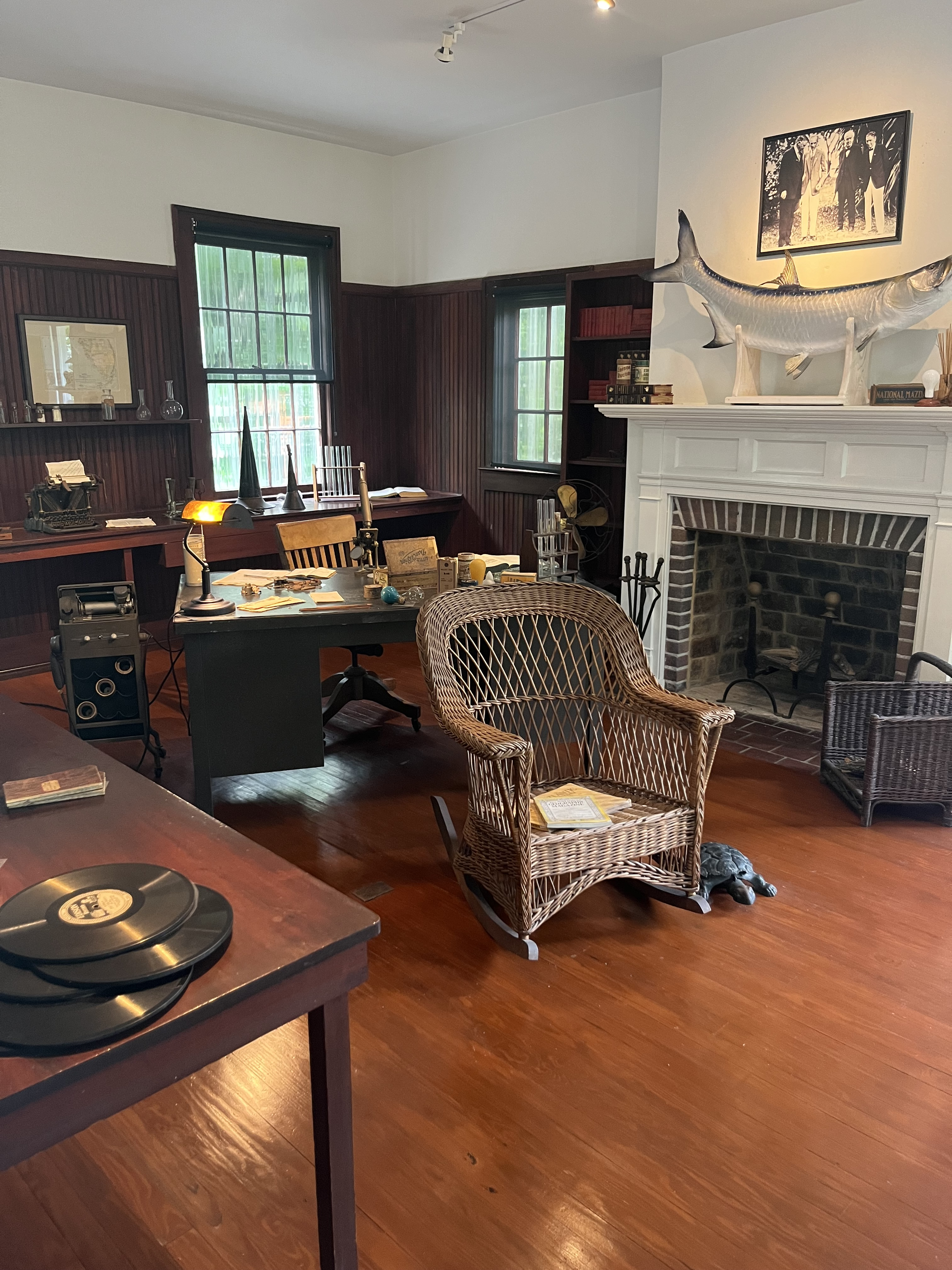
Thomas Edison's study at the Edison and Ford Winter Estates

The present site dates from 1885, when Edison first visited Southwest Florida and purchased the property to build a vacation home. He had traveled down to St. Augustine, Florida during the winter of 1885 at the behest of his doctor, who thought that the warmer climate would help cure an illness that Edison was suffering from. After recuperating in St. Augustine, he ended up traveling first across the state to Cedar Key, and from Cedar Key to Fort Myers. His home, completed in 1886 and later dubbed "Seminole Lodge", served as a winter retreat and place of relaxation until Edison's death in 1931.

Edison's good friend, Henry Ford, purchased the adjoining property, "The Mangoes" from Robert Smith of New York in 1916. Ford's craftsman style bungalow was built in 1911 by Smith. In 1947, Mrs. Mina Edison deeded the Edison property to the City of Fort Myers in memory of her husband for the enjoyment of the public. It was opened for public tours soon after.

In 1988, the adjacent Henry Ford winter estate was purchased and opened for public tours in 1990. In 2003, the governance of the site was transferred from the city to a new non-profit corporation, Thomas Edison & Henry Ford Winter Estates, Inc. (dba Edison & Ford Winter Estates, Inc.) whose mission is to protect, preserve and interpret the site. The new corporation completed a $14 million restoration project in the following years. A separate fundraising arm, Edison-Ford Winter Estates Foundation, Inc., was created to assist the restoration project with no function in governance.

== Gardens ==
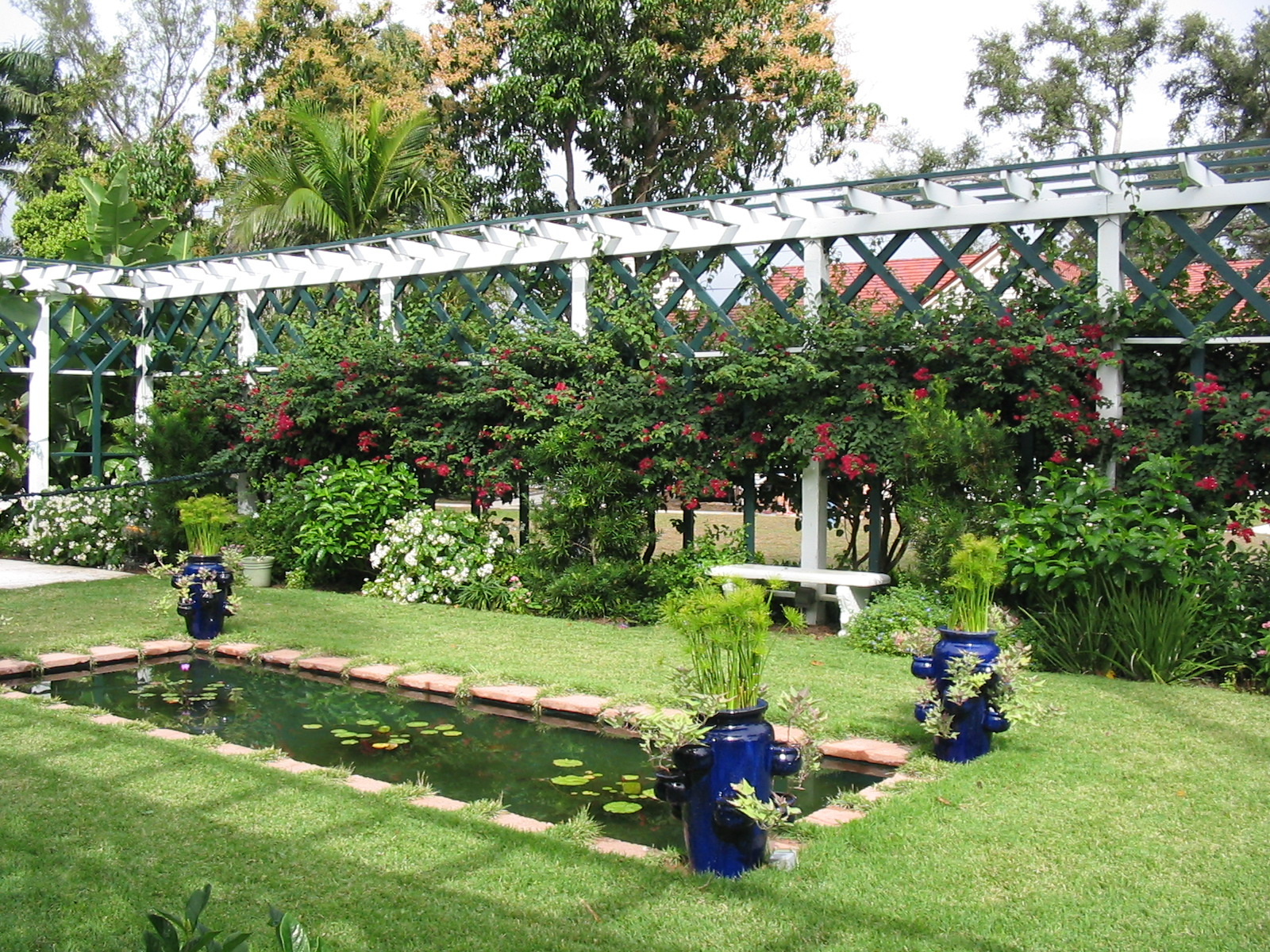
Mina Edison's Moonlight Garden

The botanical gardens feature more than 1,750 plants, comprising 890+ species and varieties from around the world, including 370+ species of ornamentals, 178 species of trees, 85 varieties of fruit trees, 106 species of palms, 12 species of bamboo, 23 species of cycads, and 36 types of vines. Some featured specimens include the African sausage tree and a 400-foot (120 m) banyan tree planted in the mid-1920s.

There are also plants grown for industrial purposes (such as bamboo, used in light bulb filaments) and those which Mina Edison planted for their beauty, including roses, orchids and bromeliads. The Moonlight Garden was designed by Ellen Biddle Shipman.

== Rubber laboratory ==
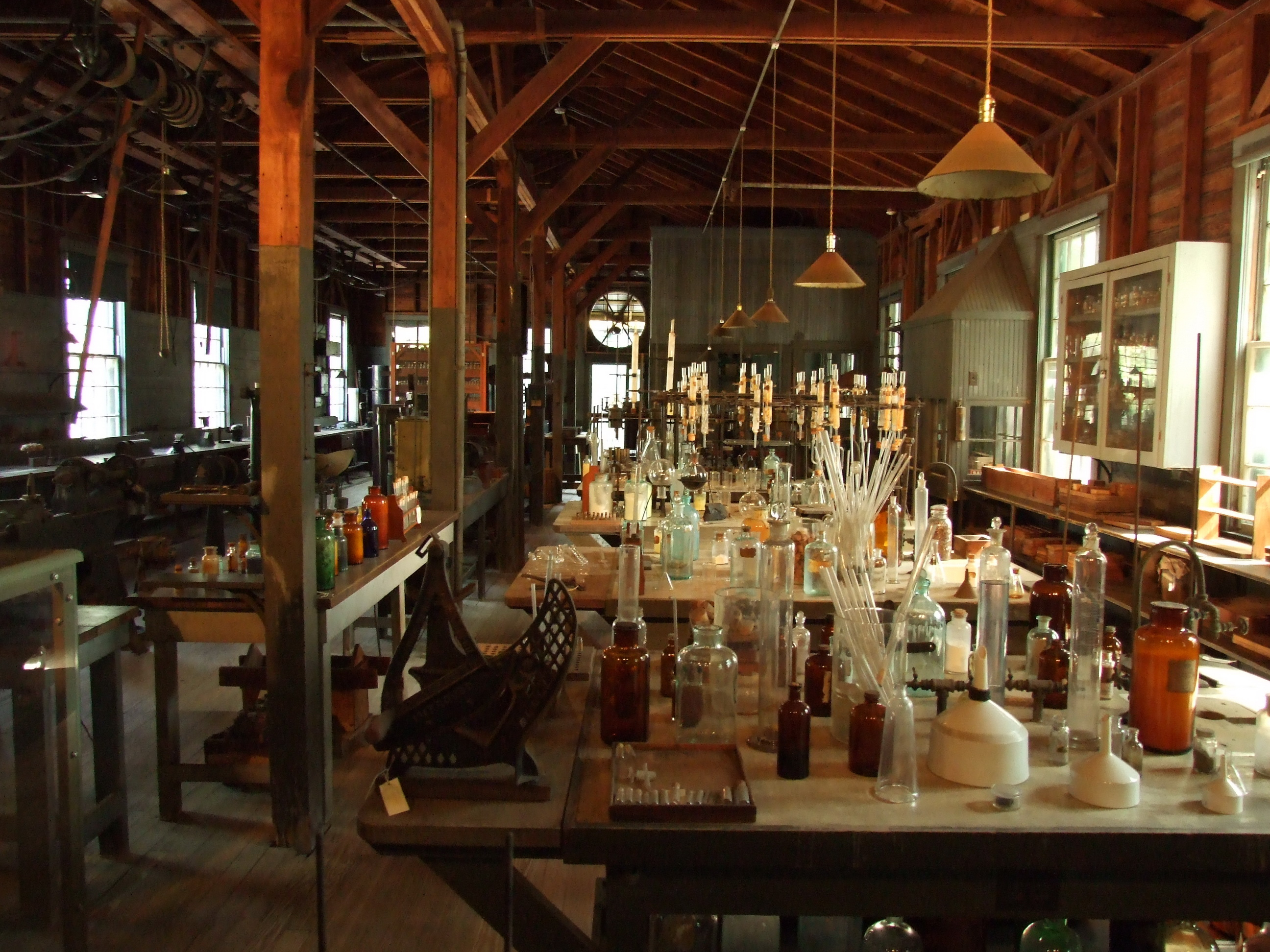
Edison's laboratory

From 1914 to 1918 (World War I), Edison became concerned with America's reliance on foreign supplies of rubber. He partnered with Harvey Firestone and Henry Ford to try to find a rubber tree or plant that could grow quickly in the United States and provide a domestic supply of rubber. In 1927, the three men contributed $25,000 each and created the Edison Botanic Research Corporation in an attempt to find a solution to this problem. In 1928, the Edison Botanic Research Corporation laboratory was constructed. It was in Fort Myers that Edison would do the majority of his research and planting of his exotic plants and trees.

After testing over 17,000 plant samples, Edison eventually discovered a source in one of the species of flowering goldenrod, Solidago leavenworthii. Thomas Edison died in 1931 and the rubber project was transferred to the United States Department of Agriculture five years later.

== Visitors ==
Ford's winter bungalow

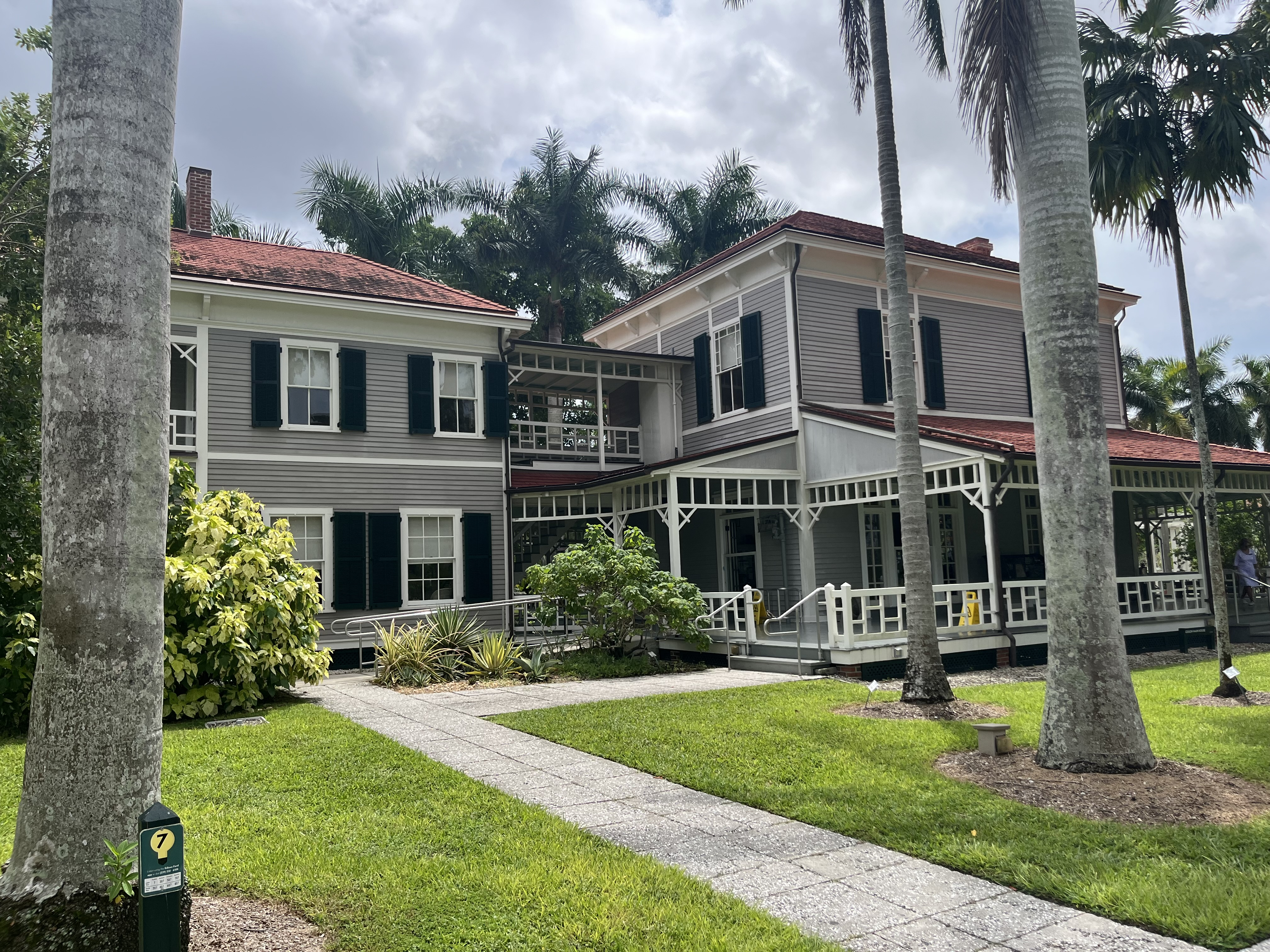
Seminole Lodge, Thomas Edison's winter home at the Edison and Ford Winter Estates

Visitors to the Edison and Ford Winter Estates in Fort Myers can view more than 20 acres (8.1 ha) of historical buildings and gardens including the 1928 Botanical Laboratory and the Edison Ford Museum. There are also a variety of programs, tours and activities.

Edison Ford also offers school and education tours for all ages, an extensive summer camp program, science and engineering class for homeschool students, emerging inventors programs for children ages 18 months – 5 years as well as travel and offsite tour opportunities. Other specialty programs include holiday nights, antique car shows, garden talks and a variety of special events throughout the year. The site can be reserved for events, weddings, corporate functions, meetings and group tours.

Edison Ford Winter Estates is a National Register Historic Site and received the Award of Excellence for restoration from both the National Trust for Historic Preservation and the National Garden Clubs, Inc. The site is a Florida Historic Landmark and has been designated as a National Historical Chemical Landmark by the American Chemical Society, the first site in the state of Florida to receive this honor.

The Edison and Ford Winter Estates research library and archival materials are also available for viewing by appointment. The research library contains over a thousand books on Fort Myers history and botany, as well as biographies on Thomas Edison and Henry Ford and their families.

Open to the public since 1947, Edison Ford Winter Estates receives more than 200,000 visitors annually. Designated as an educational and charitable not-for-profit organization, Edison Ford is governed by a board of trustees, professional staff and a large volunteer group.

== Gallery ==
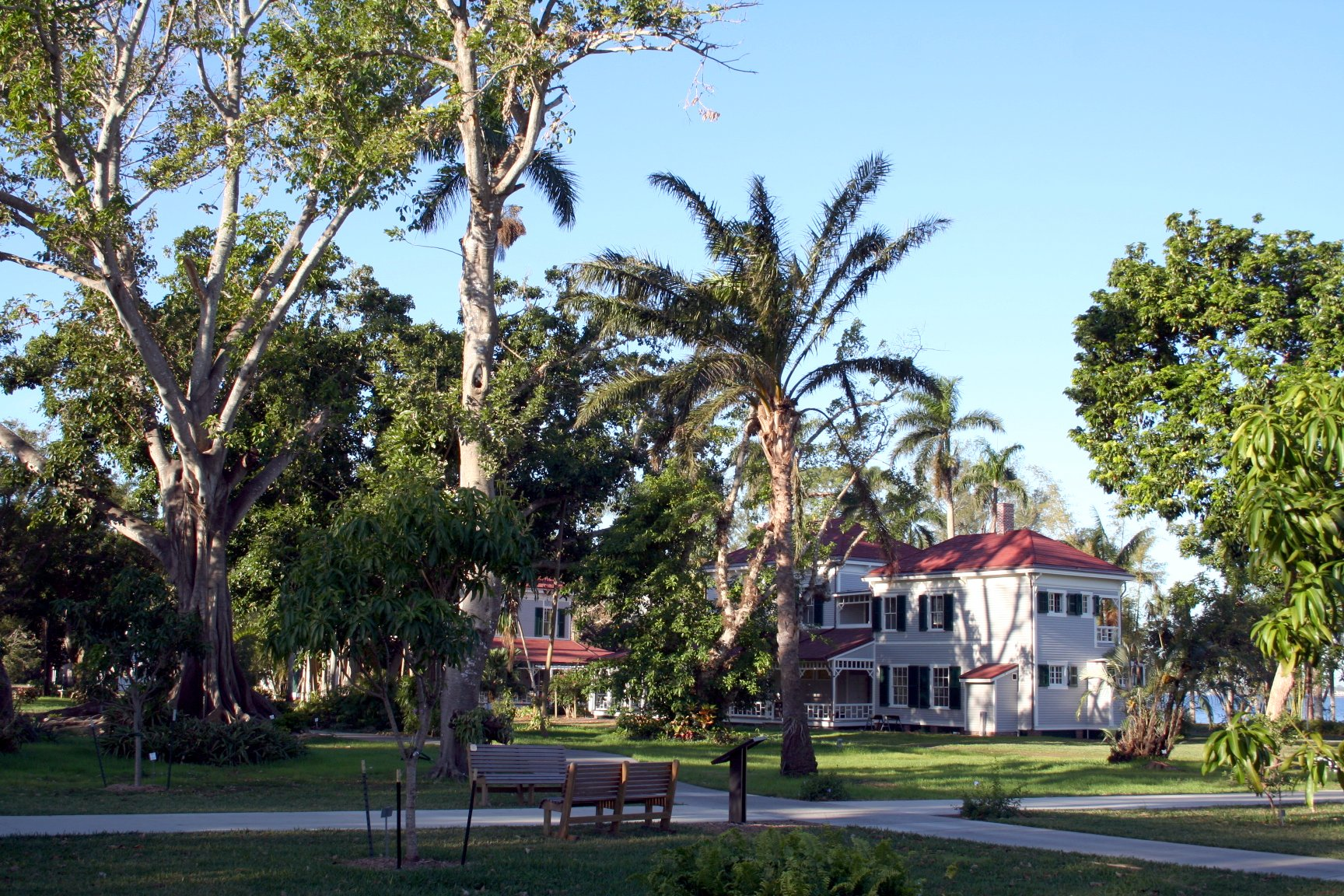
Edison's winter home – view from the road

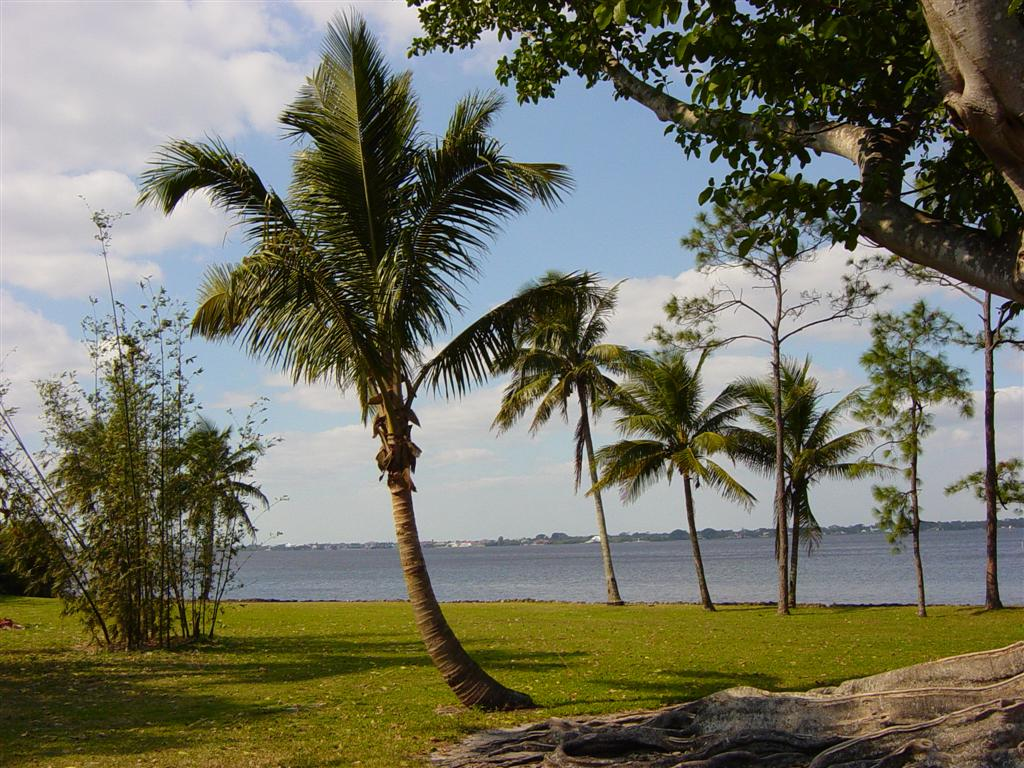
View of the Caloosahatchee River from the estate

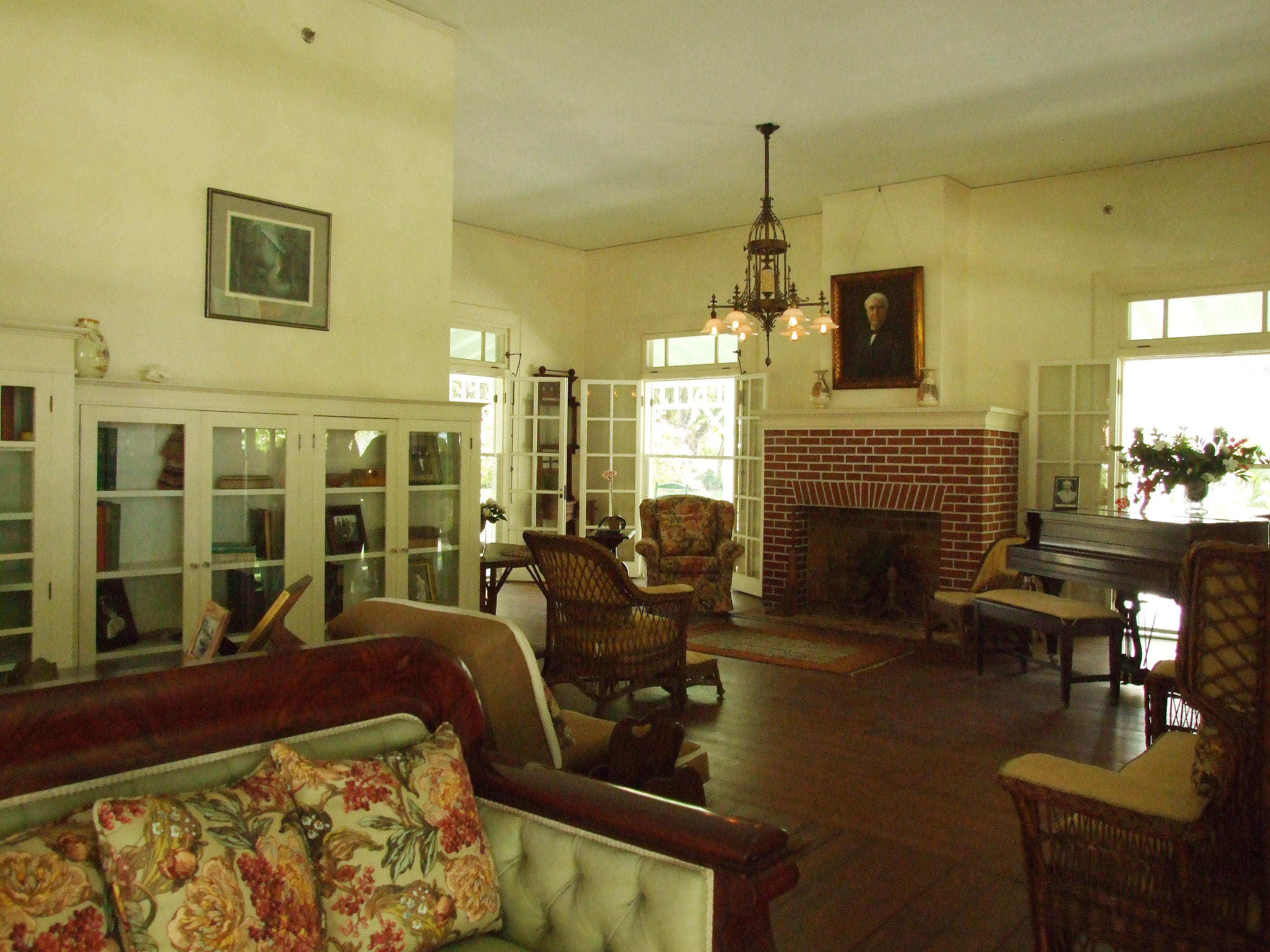
Inside Edison's house

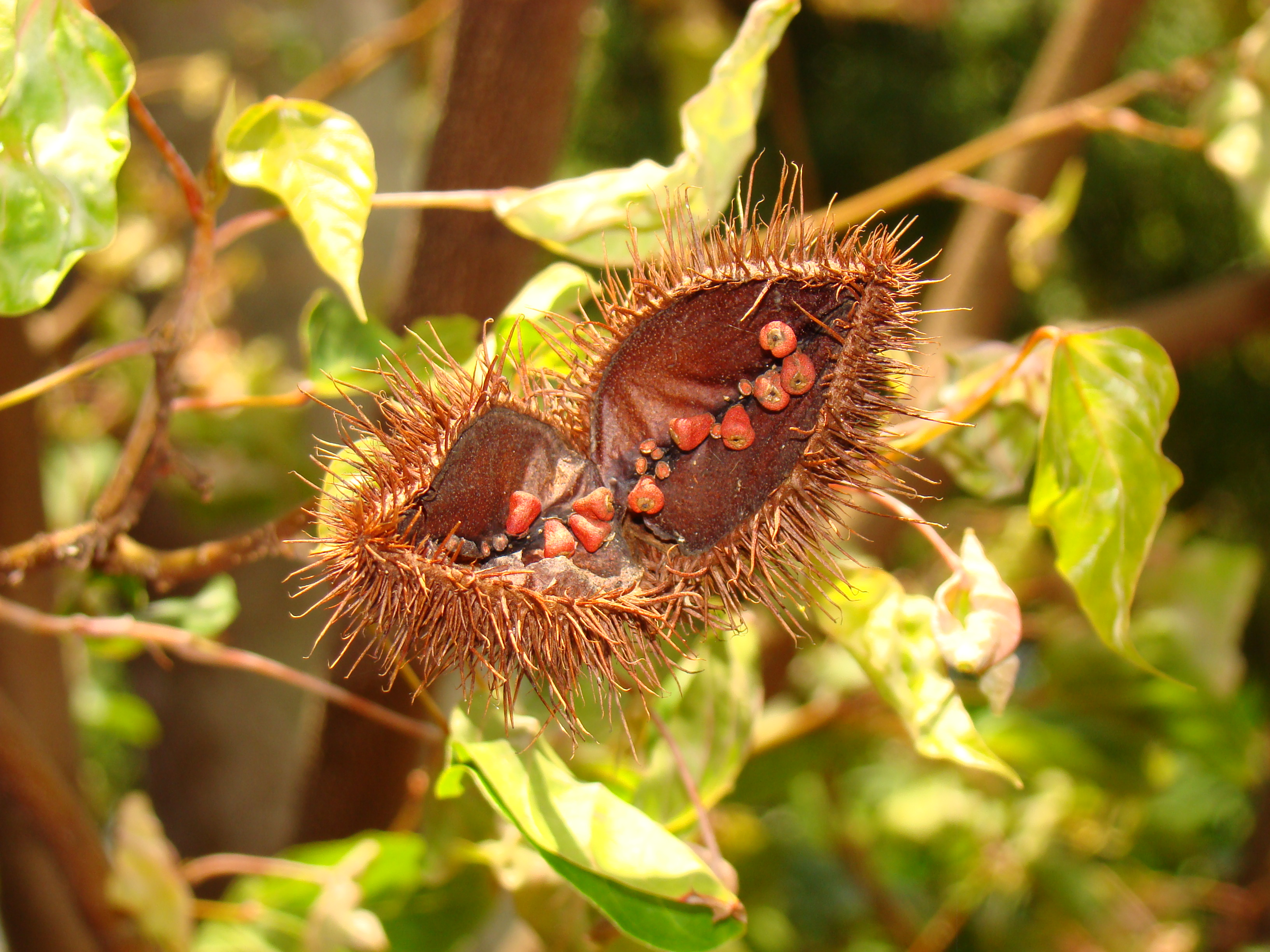
Lipstick plant

Edison family original porch furniture

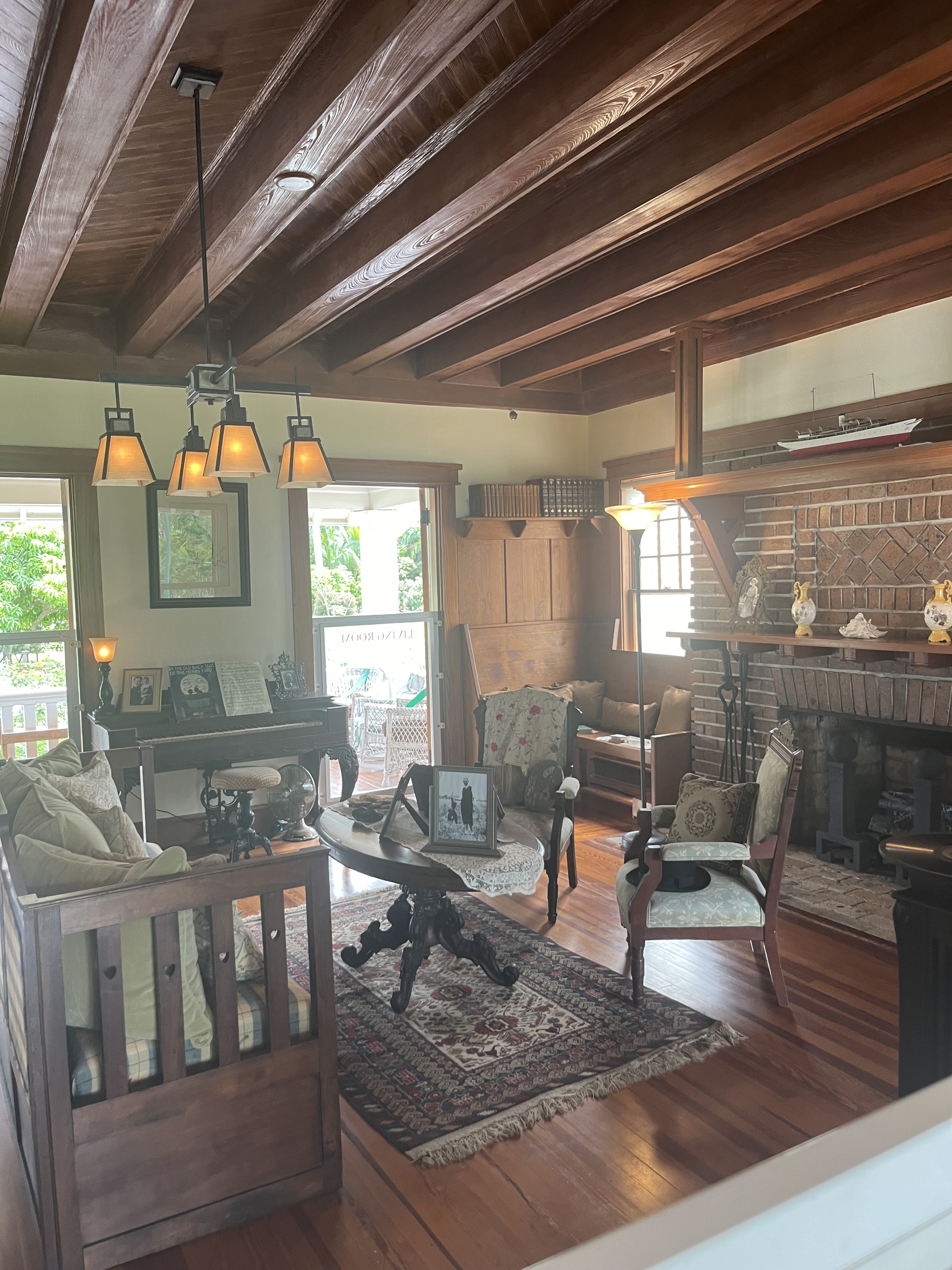
Inside Henry Ford's the Mangoes

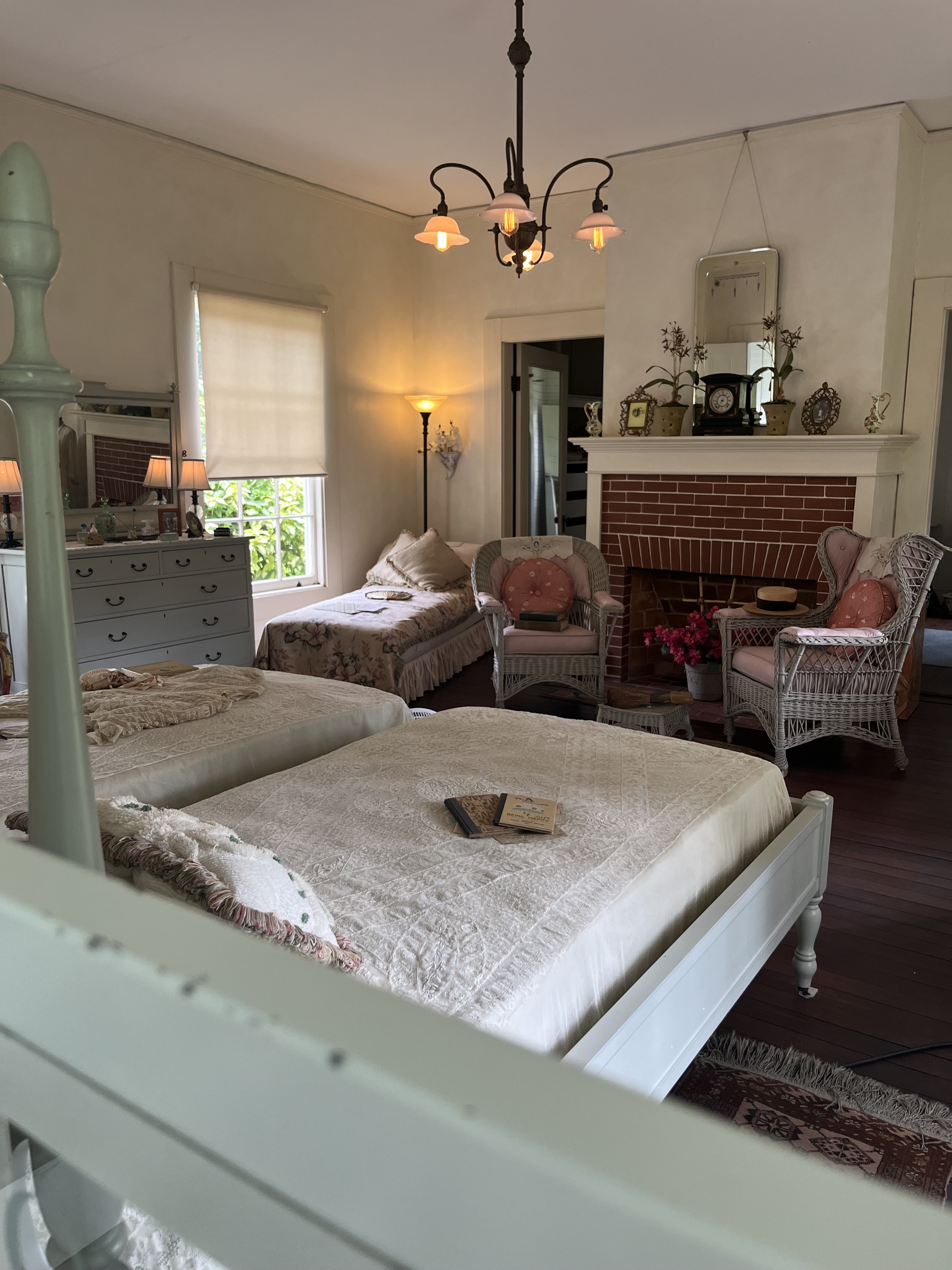
A bedroom at Edison's Seminole Lodge

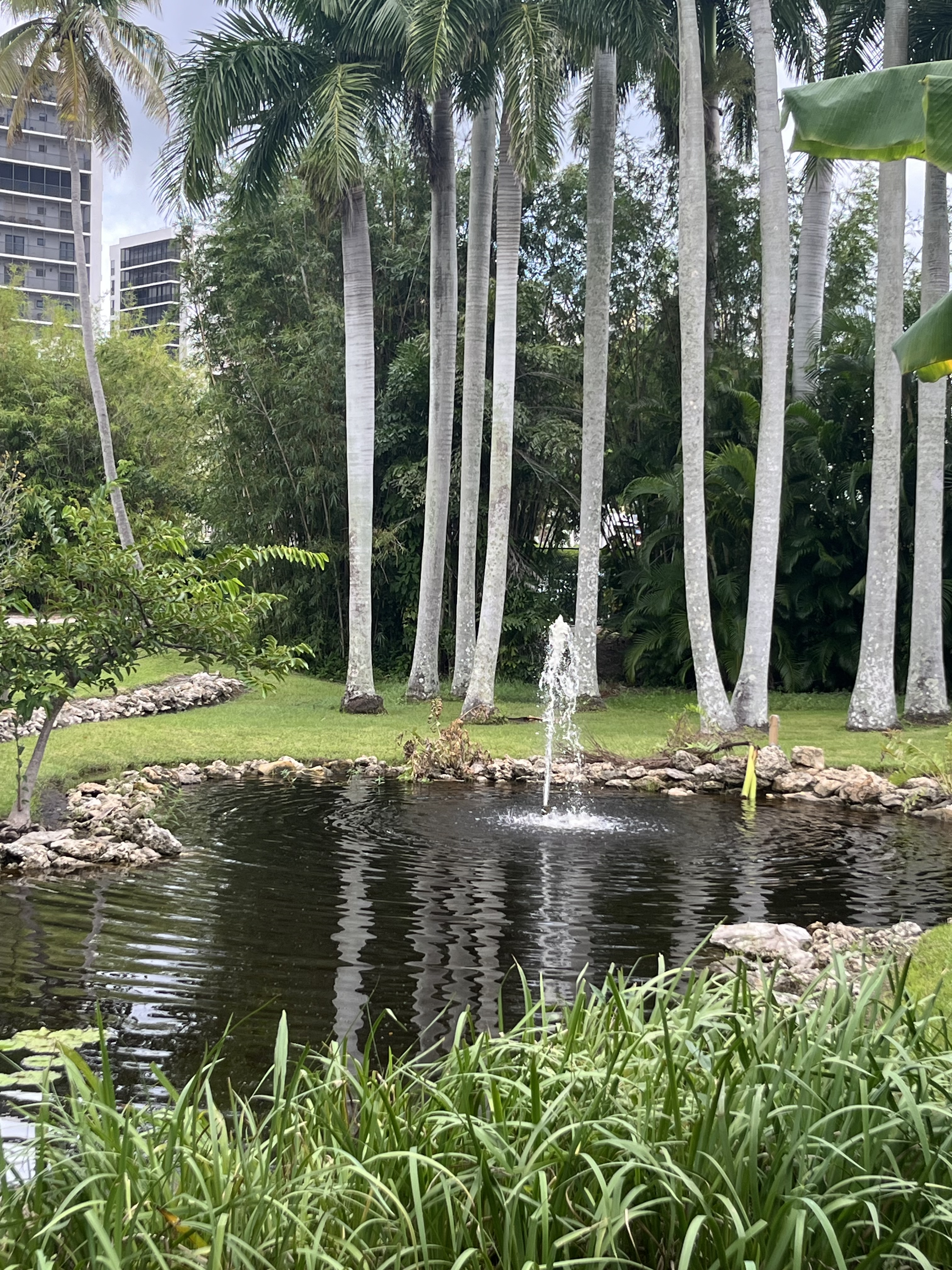
Lily pond

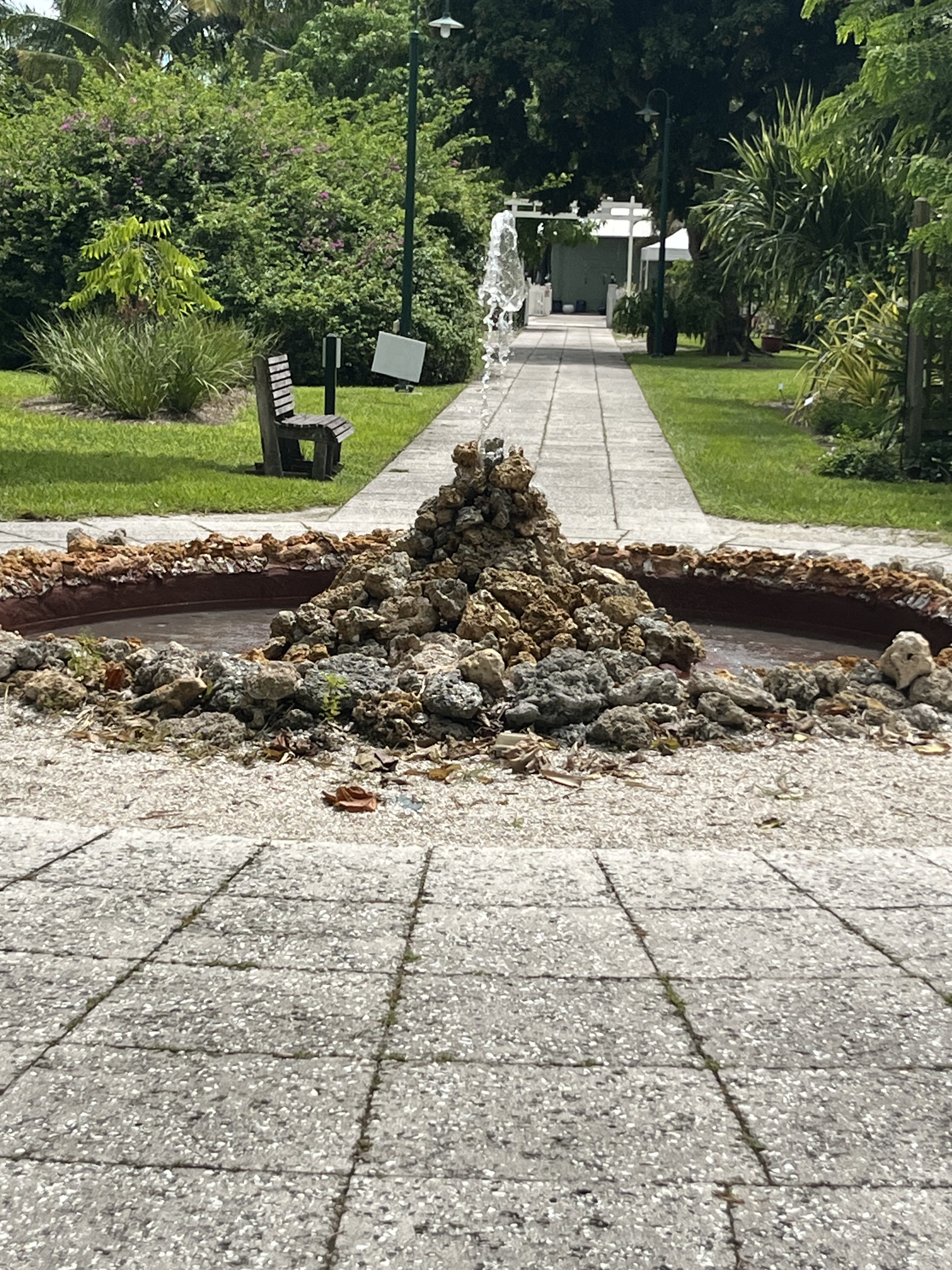
The fountain on the Edison and Ford Winter Estates

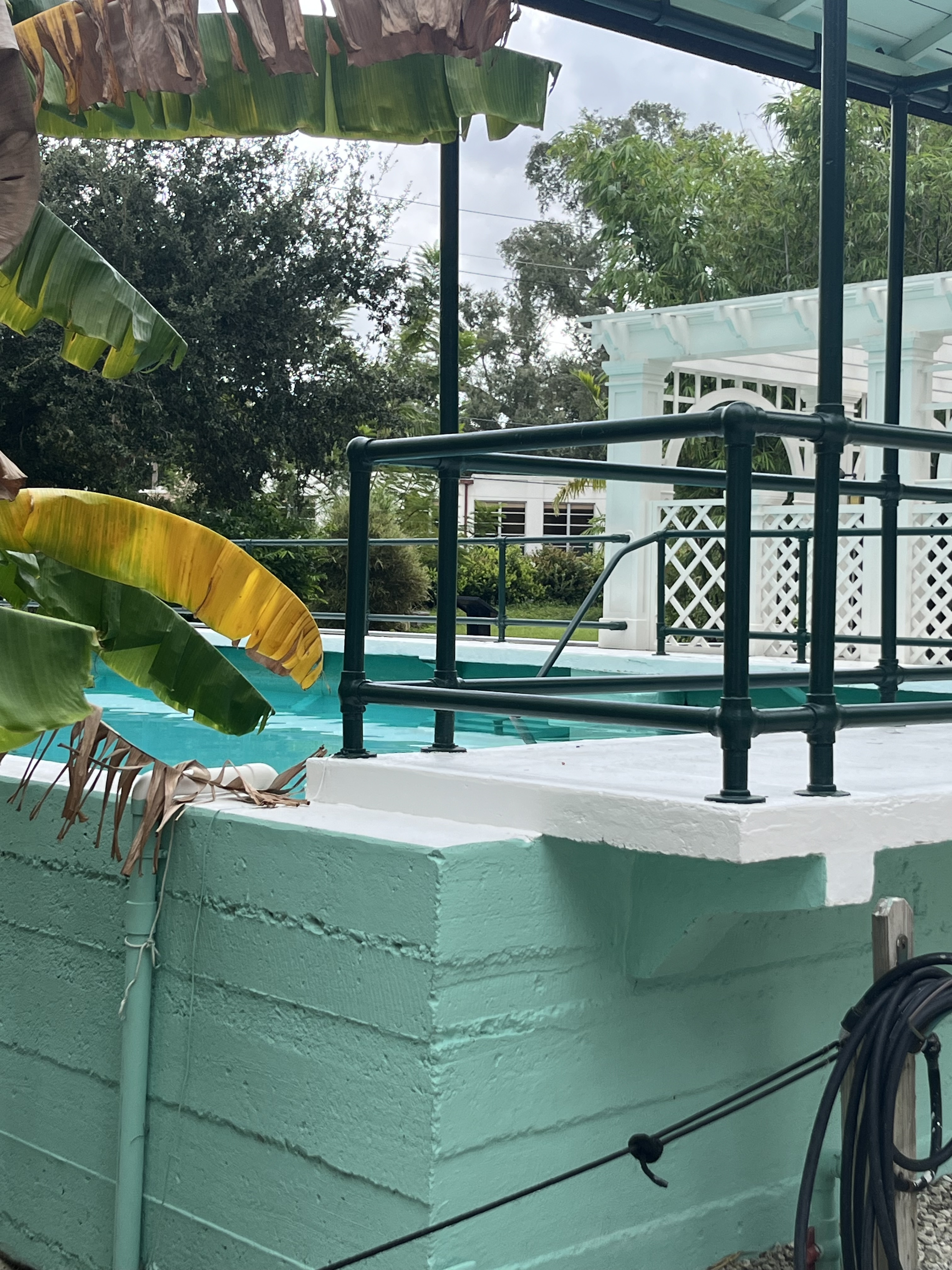
A built-in swimming pool at the Edison and Ford Winter Estates

== See also ==
- The Henry Ford
- List of Botanical Gardens in the United States
- List of historic houses in Florida
- List of museums in Florida
