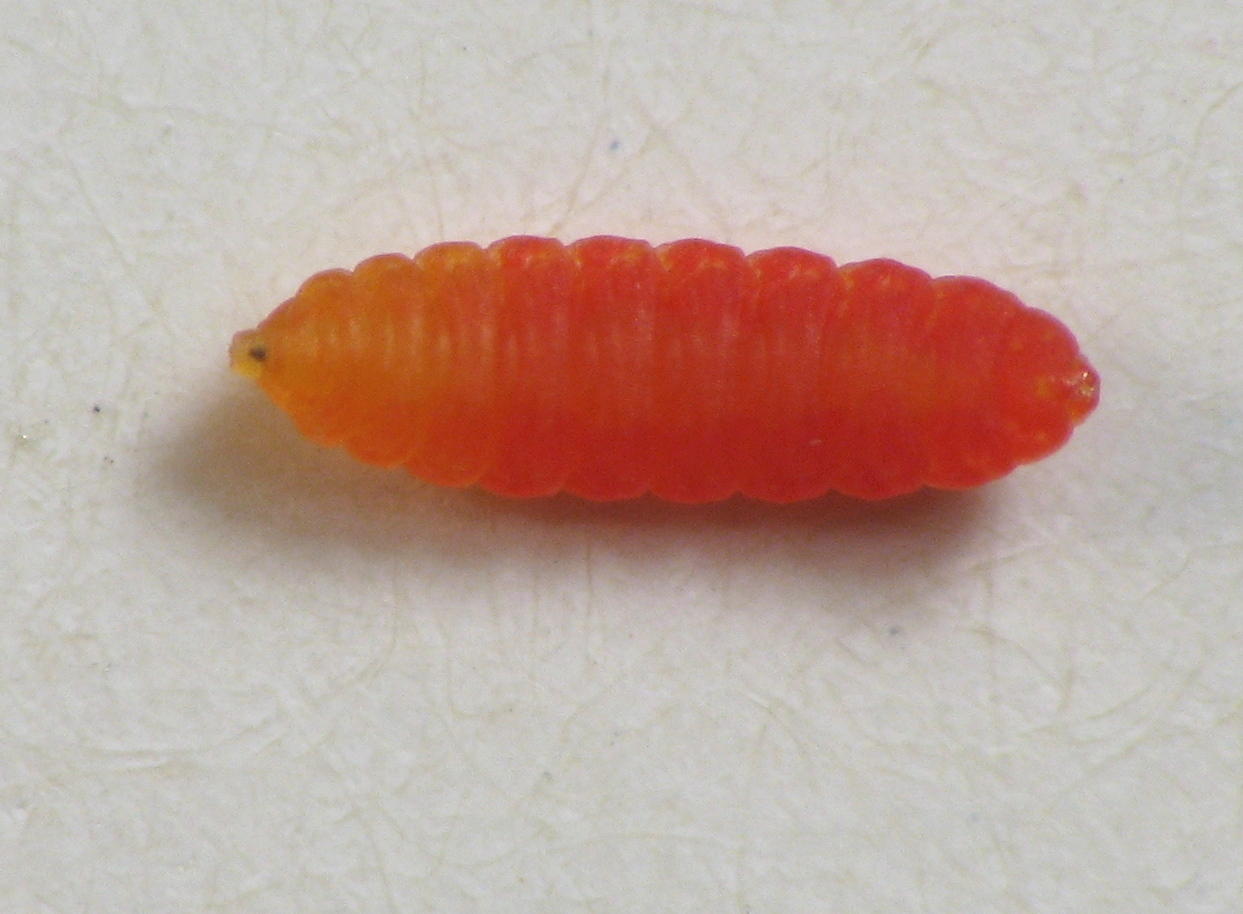
- Larva

Scientific classification
- Kingdom: Animalia
- Phylum: Arthropoda
- Class: Insecta
- Order: Diptera
- Family: Cecidomyiidae
- Genus: Schizomyia
- Species: S. racemicola

Binomial name
- Schizomyia racemicola (Osten Sacken, 1862)

Synonyms
- Cecidomyia racemicola Osten Sacken, 1862

= Schizomyia racemicola =

Species of fly

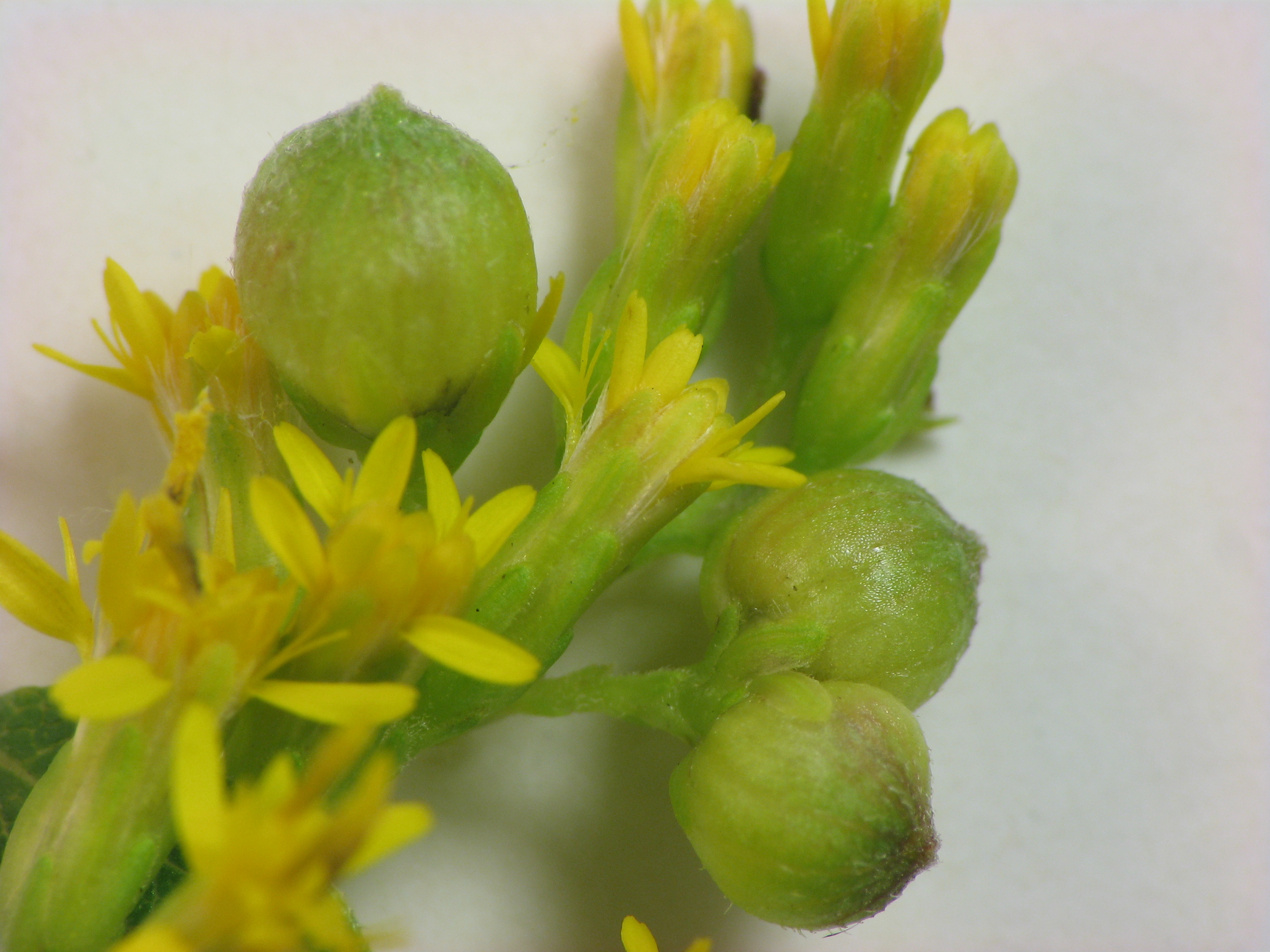
Galls on goldenrod

Schizomyia racemicola is a species of fly in the family Cecidomyiidae. This gall midge species induces galls on goldenrods in eastern North America. It was first described by Carl Robert Osten-Sacken in 1862.
