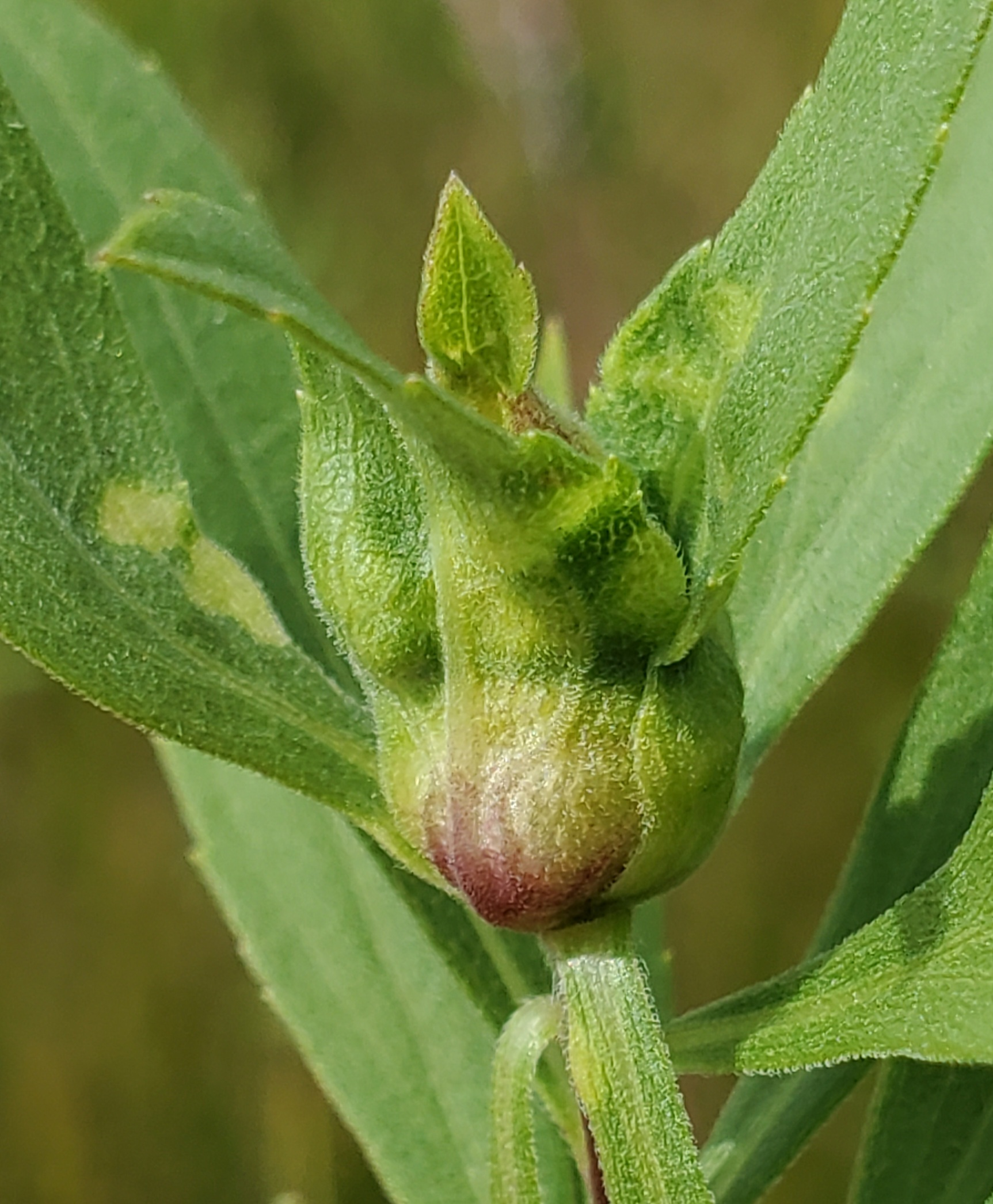
- Gall of D. folliculi

Scientific classification
- Kingdom: Animalia
- Phylum: Arthropoda
- Class: Insecta
- Order: Diptera
- Family: Cecidomyiidae
- Genus: Dasineura
- Species: D. folliculi

Binomial name
- Dasineura folliculi Felt, 1908

Synonyms
- Dasineura radifolii Felt, 1909

= Dasineura folliculi =

Species of fly

Dasineura folliculi is a species of gall midge that induces galls on several species of goldenrod in North America. It was first described by Ephraim Porter Felt in 1908. Adults live for only one to three days, mating near the goldenrod before laying eggs between leaves. Larvae are gregarious, with anywhere between five and eighty in a gall. The larvae mature within three to four weeks of hatching.
