= Anna Pierce Hobbs Bixby =

American doctor and scientist (c.1810 - c.1870)

- Born: Anna Pierce; 1808 or 1812; Philadelphia, Pennsylvania or Tennessee
- Died: 1869 or 1873 (aged 61-65); Rock Creek, Hardin County, Illinois
- Other names: Anna Bixby, Anna Bigsby, Anna Pierce Hobbs Bigsby, Anna Hobbs
- Occupations: Midwife, frontier doctor, dentist, herbologist, scientist
- Spouse(s): Isaac Hobbs (first husband), Eson Bixby (second husband)
- Medical career
- Research: Milk sickness

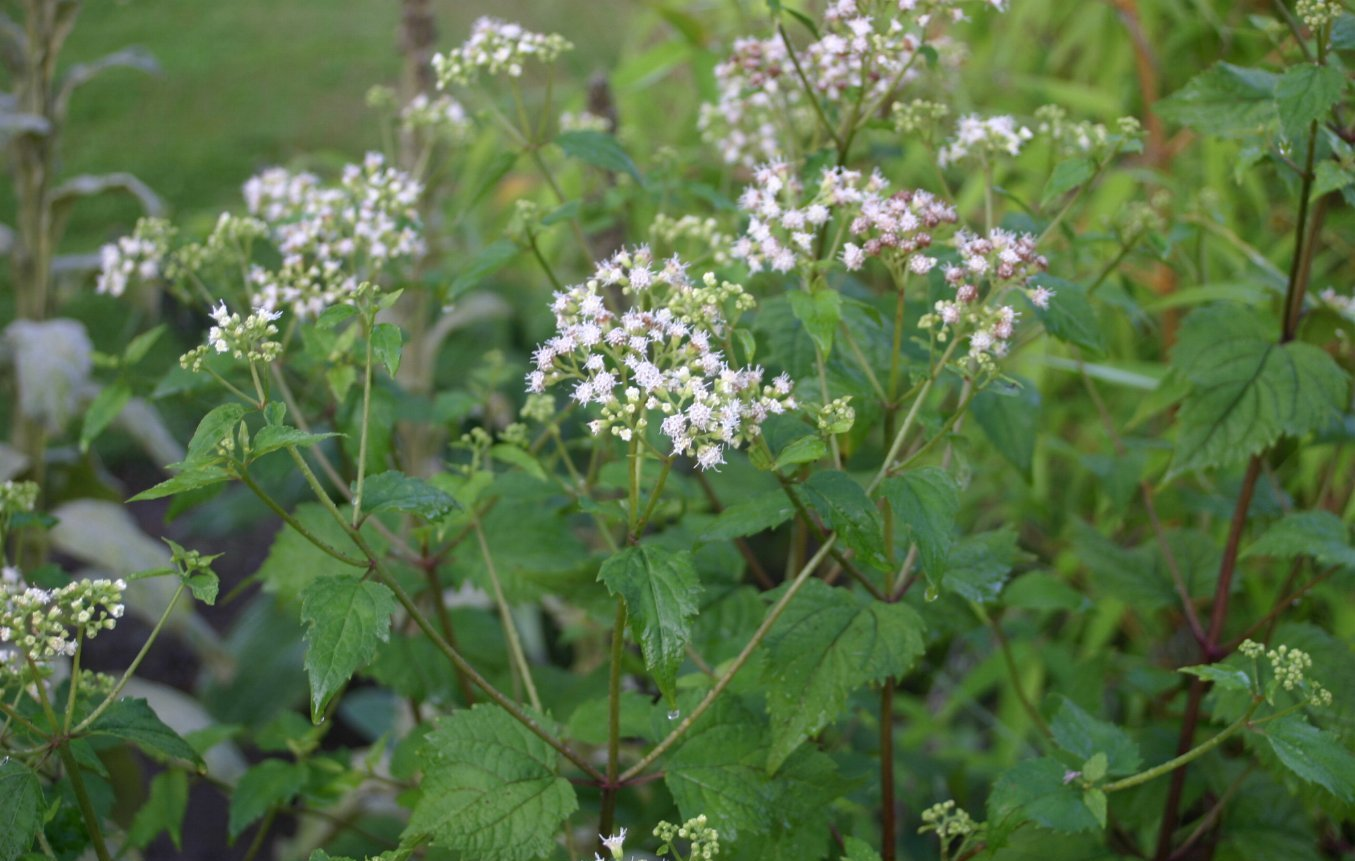
Helped by a Shawnee woman, Bixby discovered that white snakeroot (Ageratina altissima) was the cause of milk sickness from grazing cows eating the wild plant which fatally poisoned the milk consumed by frontier settlers

Anna Pierce Hobbs Bixby, sometimes spelled Bigsby, born Anna Pierce (c. 1810 – c. 1870), was a midwife, frontier doctor, dentist, herbologist, and scientist in southern Illinois.

Bixby discovered that white snakeroot (Ageratina altissima) contains a toxin. When cattle consume the plant, their meat and milk become contaminated and cause the sometimes fatal condition of milk sickness. One of the most notable and tragic cases of the "milk sickness" was that of Nancy Hanks Lincoln, the mother of Abraham Lincoln, who died at 34 years old in 1818.

== Early life ==
Bixby was the daughter of farmers, who had moved from Philadelphia and in 1828 settled in southeastern Illinois, close to what would become the village of Rock Creek. After finishing school, she traveled to Philadelphia to train in midwifery and dentistry, but on her return to Illinois she became the first physician in Hardin County and consequently, a general practitioner for her community. Bixby may also have been the first female doctor in the state of Illinois. Others claimed she was a midwife from Tennessee, married to her first husband, Isaac Hobbs.

== Research on milk sickness ==
She did thorough research of milk sickness, which was causing a good deal of fatality among both people and calves, including Anna's mother and sister-in-law. Noting the seasonal nature of the disease and the fact that sheep and goat milk were not affected, she reasoned that the cause must be a poisonous herb. However, she was unable to determine the precise cause until she was shown the White Snakeroot by a medicine woman of the Shawnee tribe.

Experiments on a calf confirmed the toxic effect of Snakeroot. However, despite her efforts, it was not until 1928 (55 years after her death) that research confirming her discovery was published.

== Eson Bixby and his criminal activities ==
After Isaac Hobbs died, Anna Pierce Hobbs married her second husband, Eson Bixby, who turned out to be a notorious outlaw around the region of Cave-In-Rock, on the Ohio River.

== Death ==
Bixby died in Rock Creek, Hardin County, Illinois.

== Legacy ==
According to local legend, Bixby left a treasure trove concealed in a cave named after her. The treasure is supposedly buried in Rock Creek, Hardin County, Illinois, and has never been found. A historical marker has been mounted in Bixby's honor in Cave-in-Rock, Illinois, near her home. Also, in southern Illinois, the Anna Bixby Women's Center in Harrisburg, Illinois, gives shelter and services to area abused women and children.
