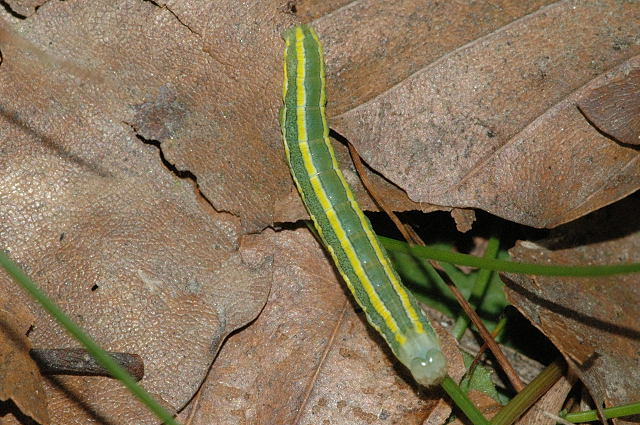
- Ceramica pisi

Scientific classification
- Kingdom: Animalia
- Phylum: Arthropoda
- Class: Insecta
- Order: Lepidoptera
- Superfamily: Noctuoidea
- Family: Noctuidae
- Tribe: Hadenini
- Genus: Ceramica; Guenée, 1852

= Ceramica (moth) =

Genus of moths

Ceramica is a genus of moths of the family Noctuidae.

== Species ==
- Ceramica picta – zebra caterpillar (Harris, 1841)
- Ceramica pisi – broom moth (Linnaeus, 1758)
