= C13H14O3 =

The molecular formula C_{13}H_{14}O_{3} (molar mass: 218.248 g/mol, exact mass: 218.0943 u) may refer to:

- NCS-382
- Toxol
