= Leucospilapteryx anaphalidis =

Scientific classification
- Kingdom: Animalia
- Phylum: Arthropoda
- Class: Insecta
- Order: Lepidoptera
- Family: Gracillariidae
- Genus: Leucospilapteryx
- Species: L. anaphalidis

Binomial name
- Leucospilapteryx anaphalidis Kumata, 1965

Species of moth

Leucospilapteryx anaphalidis is a moth of the family Gracillariidae. It is known from Japan (the islands of Hokkaidō and Honshū) and the Russian Far East.

The wingspan is 6.0–7.1 mm.

The larvae feed on Anaphalis margaritacea. They mine the leaves of their host plant.
