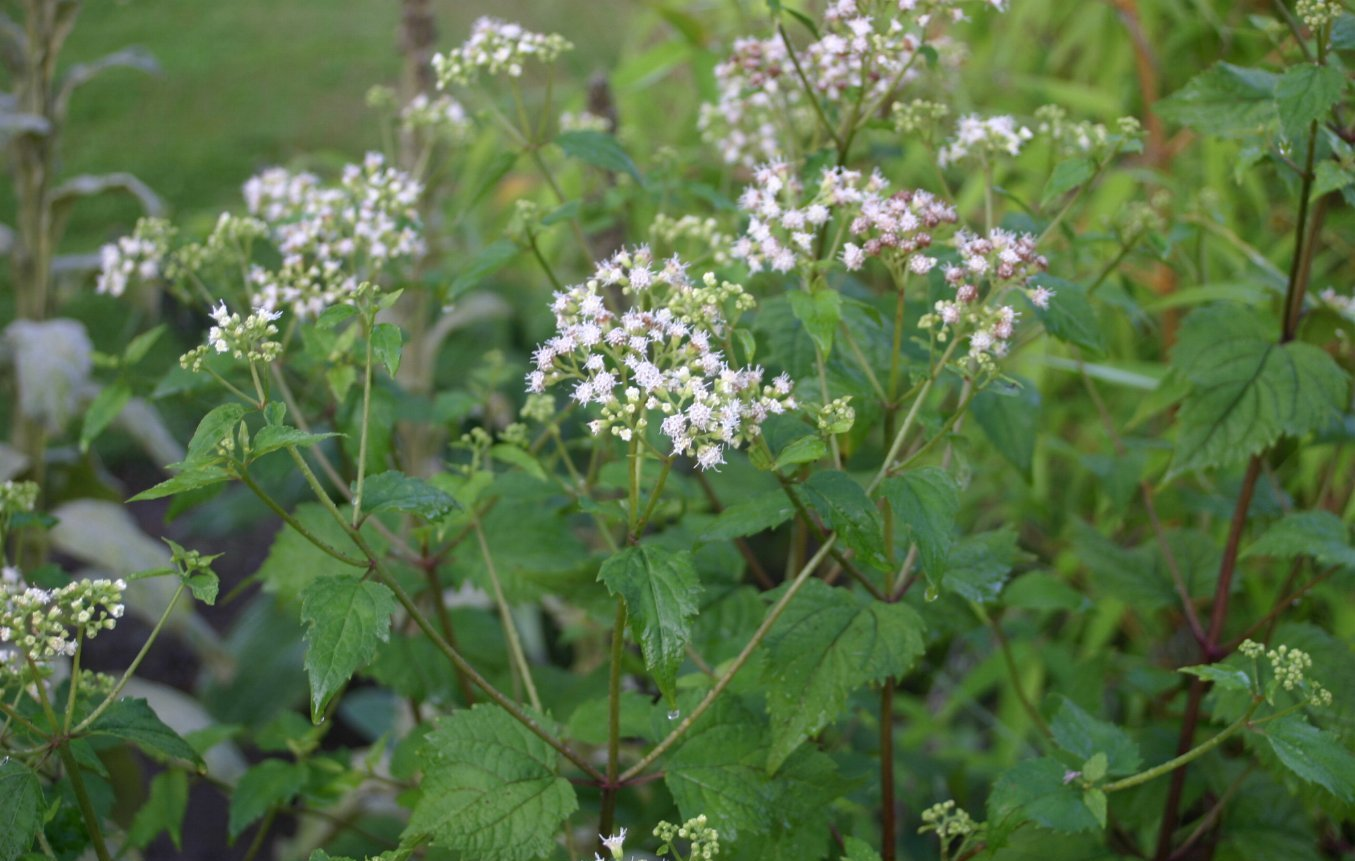

Conservation status
- Secure (NatureServe)

Scientific classification
- Kingdom: Plantae
- Clade: Tracheophytes
- Clade: Angiosperms
- Clade: Eudicots
- Clade: Asterids
- Order: Asterales
- Family: Asteraceae
- Genus: Ageratina
- Species: A. altissima

Binomial name
- Ageratina altissima (L.) King & H.E.Robins.
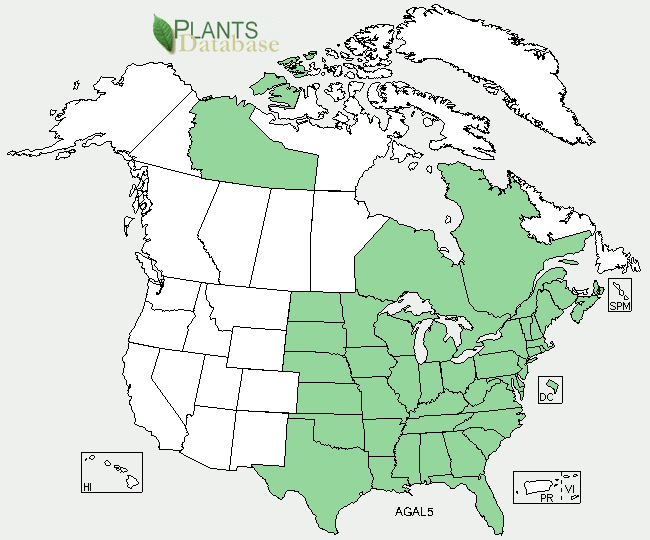
- Natural range in North America

Synonyms
- List: Ageratina ageratoides (L.f.) Spach; Ageratina luciae-brauniae (Fernald) R.M.King & H.Rob.; Ageratum altissimum L.; Batschia nivea Moench; Eupatorium aboriginum Greene; Eupatorium ageratoides L.f.; Eupatorium angustatum: (A.Gray) Greene; Eupatorium boreale Greene; Eupatorium cordatum var. fraseri (Poir.) DC.; Eupatorium deltoides E.L.Braun 1940, illegitimate homonym not Eupatorium deltoideum Jacq. 1798; Eupatorium eurybiaefolium Greene; Eupatorium frasieri Poir.; Eupatorium luciae-brauniae Fernald; Eupatorium roanense Small; Eupatorium rugosum Houtt.; Eupatorium urticifolium Reichard

= Ageratina altissima =

Species of plant

Ageratina altissima, also known as white snakeroot, richweed, or white sanicle, is a poisonous perennial herb in the family Asteraceae, native to eastern and central North America. An older binomial name for this species is Eupatorium rugosum, but the genus Eupatorium has undergone taxonomic revision by botanists, and some species once included in it have been moved to other genera.

== Description ==
Plants are upright or sometimes ascending, growing to 1.5 metres (4.9 ft) tall, producing single or multi-stemmed clumps in mid to late summer and fall. Stems are smooth with opposite leaves spaced well apart, with each pair of leaves positioned at a 90-degree angle from the pair above and below (decussate). The upper part of the plant has multiple branches, which usually appear in opposite pairs. Leaves have sharply serrated margins and are up to 15 centimetres (6 in) long.

At the end of the upper branches, flat-topped panicles or compound corymbs of white flower heads appear, measuring 5–15 centimetres (2–6 in) across. The flowers are a clean white color and after blooming, small seeds with fluffy white tails are released to blow in the wind. The plant can spread either by the wind dispersal of its seeds or by rhizomes.

There are two different varieties: Ageratina altissima var. altissima and Ageratina altissima var. roanensis (Appalachian white snakeroot); they differ in the length of the flower phyllaries and shape of the apices.

== Distribution and habitat ==
A. altissima is native to the central and eastern United States, from Texas in the west to Maine in the east and north, and Florida in the south. The species is also native in Canada in Quebec, Ontario, and the Northwest Territories. The species is adaptive to different growing conditions: it is found in woods and brush thickets and also in shady areas with open bare ground, and it can be weedy in shady landscapes and hedgerows.

== Ecology ==
The plant blooms in the fall, from July to October. Its nectar attracts many species of butterflies and moths, bees, wasps, and flies. It is a larval host for a few varieties of moths, including the Clymene moth (Haploa clymene), Leucospilapteryx venustella, and the hitched dart moth (Melanchra adjuncta).

=== Galls ===
This species is host to the following insect induced galls:

- Asphondylia eupatorii Felt, 1911 (spring and summer generations) stem gall midge
- Neolasioptera eupatorii (Felt, 1907) stem gall midge
- Schizomyia eupatoriflorae (Beutenmuller, 1907) stem gall midge (see image).

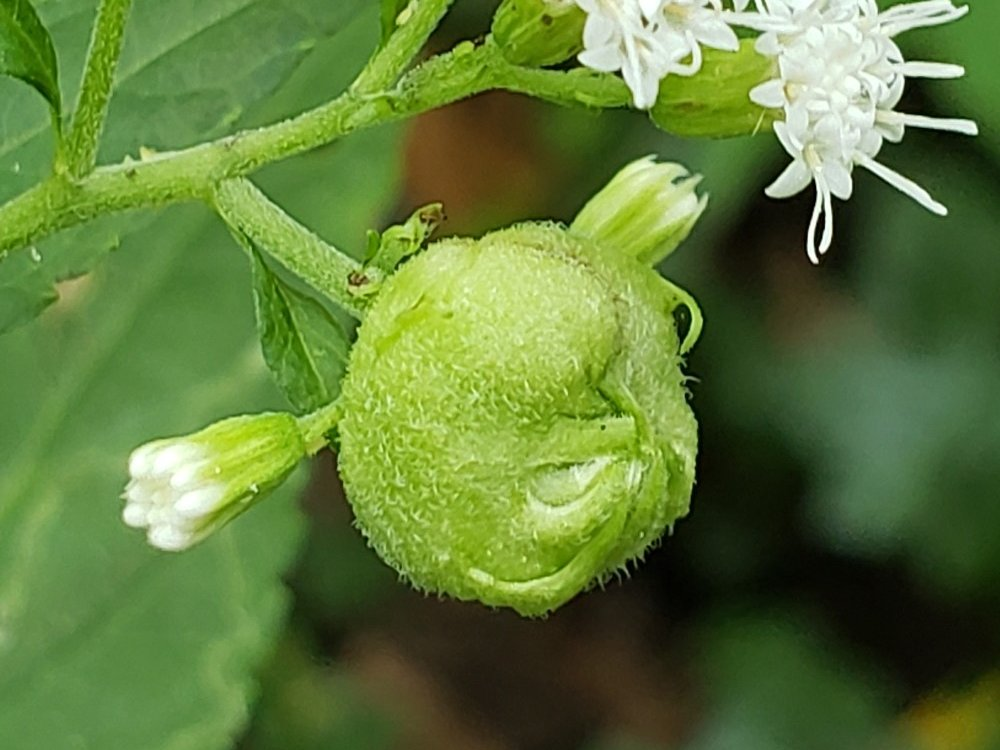
Schizomyia eupatoriflorae

== Toxicity ==
White snakeroot contains the toxin tremetol; when the plants are consumed by cattle, the meat and milk become contaminated with the toxin. When milk or meat containing the toxin is consumed, the poison is passed on to humans. If consumed in large enough quantities, it can cause tremetol poisoning in humans. The poisoning is also called milk sickness, as humans often ingested the toxin by drinking the milk of cows that had eaten snakeroot. Although 80% of the plant's toxin, tremetone, decreases after being dried and stored away for 5 years, its toxic properties remain the same.

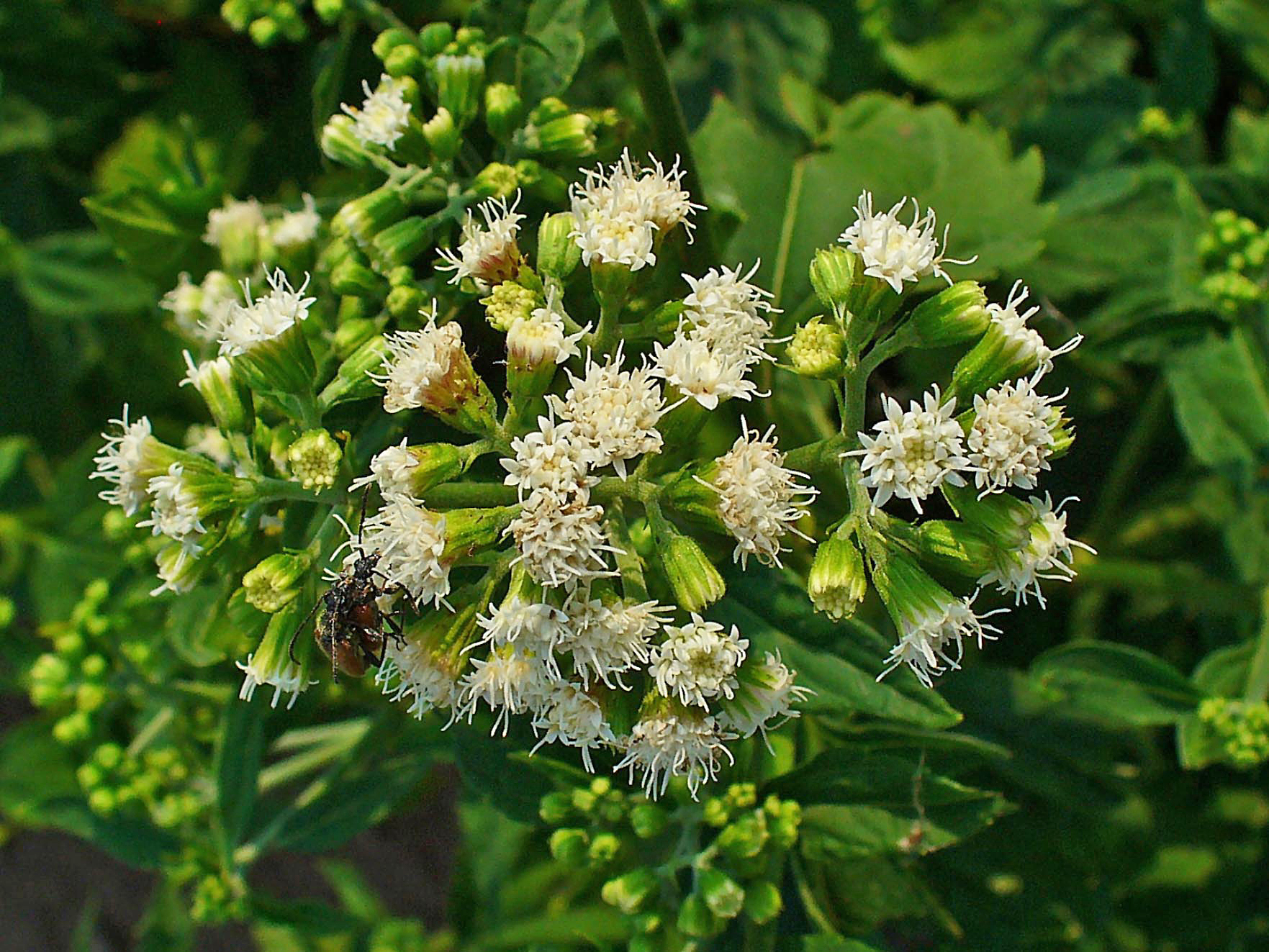
Inflorescences

During the early 19th century, when large numbers of European Americans from the East, who were unfamiliar with snakeroot, began settling in the plant's habitat of the Midwest and Upper South, many thousands were killed by milk sickness. Notably, milk sickness was possibly the cause of death in 1818 of Nancy Hanks Lincoln, mother of Abraham Lincoln.

It was some decades before European Americans traced the cause to snakeroot, although today Dr. Anna Pierce Hobbs Bixby is credited with identifying the plant in the 1830s. Legend has it that she was taught about the plant's properties by a Shawnee woman.

In addition to cattle, the plants are also poisonous to horses, goats, and sheep. Signs of poisoning in these animals include depression and lethargy, placement of hind feet close together (horses, goats, cattle) or held far apart (sheep), nasal discharge, excessive salivation, arched body posture, and rapid or difficult breathing.

== Cultivation ==
A cultivar, sold under the name Eupatorium rugosum 'Chocolate', is grown in gardens for its dark-tinted foliage. The darkest color, which is a chocolate black, occurs in plants grown in a sunny location. The plants are shade-tolerant and do best in moist soils. More recently, the plant can be found under the correct species name.

== Etymology ==
Ageratina is derived from Greek meaning 'un-aging', in reference to the flowers keeping their color for a long time. This name was used by Dioscorides for a number of different plants.

Altissima means "the tallest", and probably indicates that this is the tallest species in its genus.

== See also ==
- List of poisonous plants
- List of plants poisonous to equines
