= White snakeroot =

White snakeroot is a common name for several flowering plants in the aster family, Asteraceae, and may refer to:

- Ageratina altissima, native to eastern North America (older name: Eupatorium rugosum)
- Ayapana triplinervis, native to the tropical Americas
