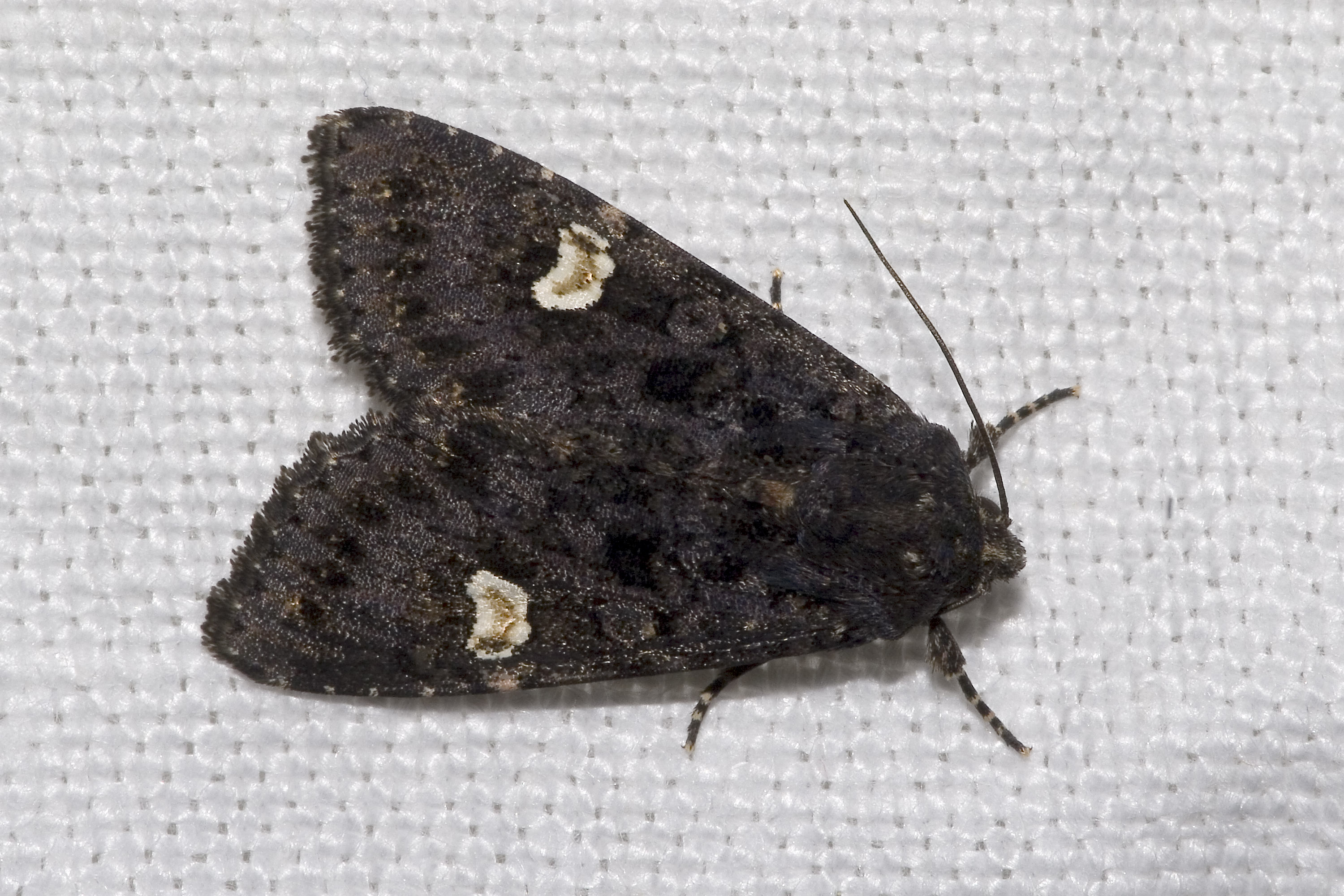
- Melanchra persicariae

Scientific classification
- Kingdom: Animalia
- Phylum: Arthropoda
- Clade: Pancrustacea
- Class: Insecta
- Order: Lepidoptera
- Superfamily: Noctuoidea
- Family: Noctuidae
- Subfamily: Noctuinae
- Tribe: Hadenini
- Genus: Melanchra; Hübner, 1820

Synonyms
- Ceramica

= Melanchra =

Genus of moths

Melanchra is a genus of moths of the family Noctuidae.

== Species ==
- Melanchra adjuncta (Boisduval, 1852)
- Melanchra assimilis (Morrison, 1874)
- Melanchra diabolica Plante, 1990
- Melanchra dierli Behounek, 1995
- Melanchra granti Warren, 1905
- Melanchra persicariae (Linnaeus, 1761) – Dot moth
- Melanchra picta (Harris, 1841) – Zebra caterpillar moth
- Melanchra postalba Sugi, 1982
- Melanchra pulverulenta (Smith, 1888)
