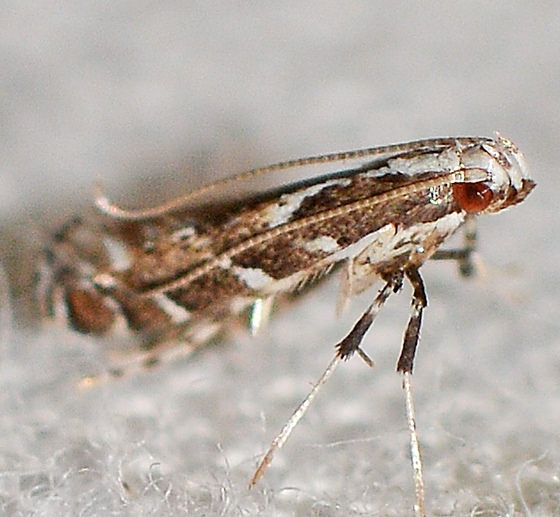

Scientific classification
- Kingdom: Animalia
- Phylum: Arthropoda
- Clade: Pancrustacea
- Class: Insecta
- Order: Lepidoptera
- Family: Gracillariidae
- Genus: Leucospilapteryx
- Species: L. venustella

Binomial name
- Leucospilapteryx venustella (Clemens, 1860)

Synonyms
- Gracilaria venustella Clemens, 1860; Leucospilapteryx eupatoriella (Chambers, 1872); Leucospilapteryx eupatoriiella (Chambers, 1878)

= Leucospilapteryx venustella =

Species of moth

Leucospilapteryx venustella is a moth of the family Gracillariidae. It is known from Canada (Québec) and the United States (the Atlantic states, Maine, Michigan, Missouri, Ohio, Pennsylvania, Vermont, Maryland and Kentucky).

The wingspan is about 6 mm.

The larvae feed on Ageratina ageratoides, Ageratina altissima and Eupatorium urticifolium. They mine the leaves of their host plant.
