= Rock Creek, Hardin County, Illinois =

- Unincorporated community
- Location within Illinois Location within the United States
- Coordinates: 37°32′12″N 88°13′38″W
- Country: United States
- State: Illinois
- County: Hardin
- Elevation: 564 ft (172 m)
- Time zone: UTC-6 (Central (CST))
  - Summer (DST): UTC-5 (CDT)
- Area code: 618
- GNIS feature ID: 425397

Rock Creek is an unincorporated community in Hardin County, Illinois, United States. Rock Creek is north of Cave-in-Rock and northeast of Elizabethtown.

== Notable people ==
- Anna Pierce Hobbs Bixby, midwife, frontier doctor, dentist, herbologist, scientist.
