= Milk sickness =

Kind of poisoning

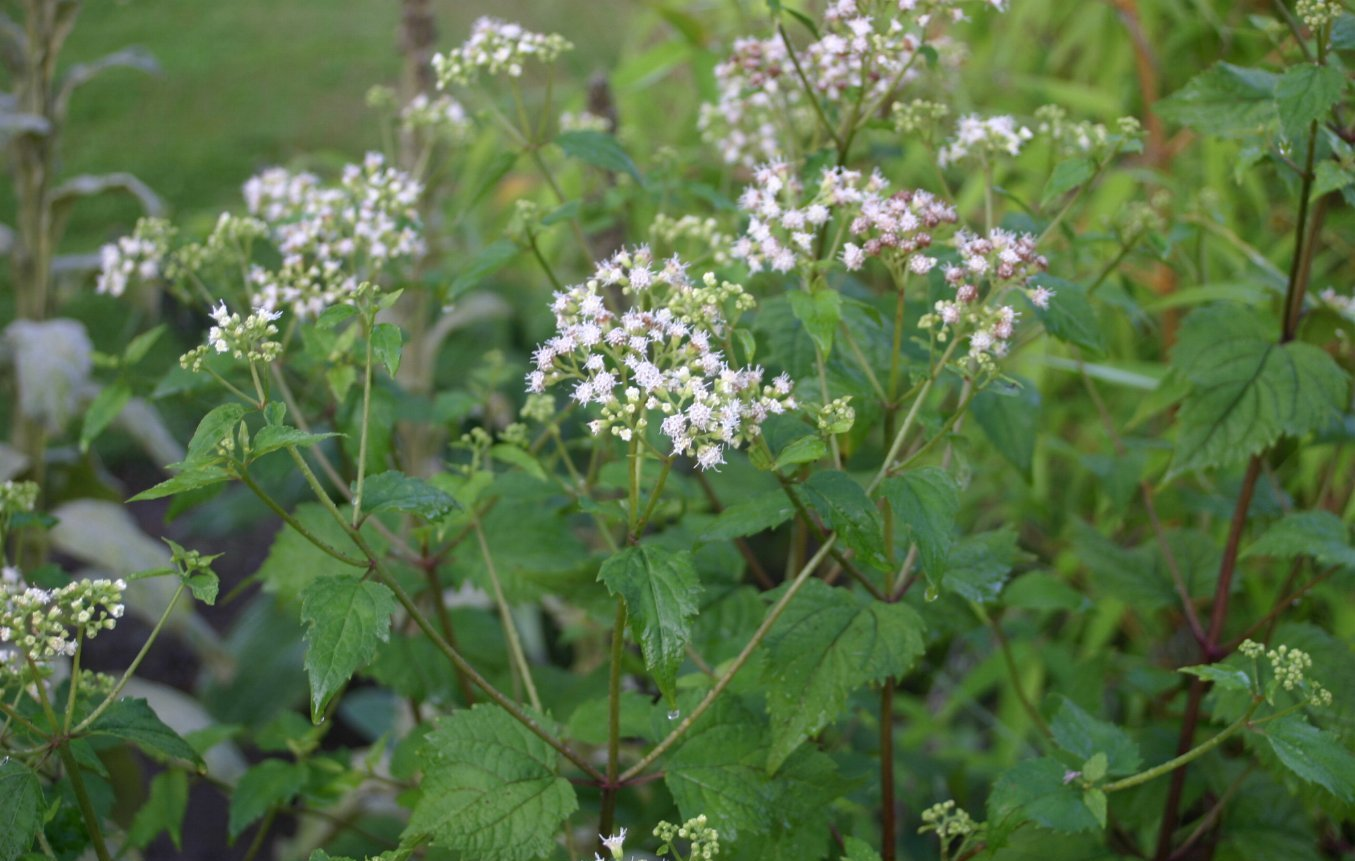
- Ageratina altissima, the plant that causes milk sickness
- Specialty: Medical toxicology

Milk sickness, also known as tremetol vomiting, is a kind of poisoning characterized by trembling, vomiting, and severe intestinal pain that affects individuals who ingest milk, other dairy products, or meat from a cow that has fed on the white snakeroot plant, which contains the poison tremetol. In animals it is known as trembles.

Although very rare today, milk sickness claimed thousands of lives among migrants to the Midwestern United States in the early 19th century, especially in frontier areas along the Ohio River Valley and its tributaries where white snakeroot was prevalent. New settlers were unfamiliar with the plant and its properties. Nancy Hanks Lincoln, the mother of Abraham Lincoln, is said to have been a victim of the poison. Nursing calves and lambs may have also died from their mothers' milk contaminated with snakeroot even when the adult cows and sheep showed no signs of poisoning. Cattle, horses, and sheep are the animals most often poisoned.

Anna Pierce Hobbs Bixby is credited by the American medical community with having identified white snakeroot as the cause of the illness. Allegedly, she was told about the plant's properties by an elderly Shawnee woman she befriended, after which Bixby conducted tests to observe and document evidence.

== Symptoms ==
An early sign in several animals including cattle, sheep, and guinea pigs is listlessness, which is commonly followed by significant loss of weight and pronounced trembling in the legs and muzzle. These signs often appear several hours after ingestion of white snakeroot. Abdominal pain, polydipsia, and vomiting may be noted. As the effects of the poison progress, constipation, appetite loss, weakness, and difficulty standing and/or walking are usually observed. Complete loss of muscle coordination, stupor, and/or coma precede death. Death usually occurs within two to ten days of symptom onset.

Signs unique to cattle and sheep include peculiar odors found in the breath and urine, breathing difficulties, and over-salivation. Symptoms unique to horses include depression, bloody urine, and choking. In addition to increased heart rate and jugular pulse, swelling around the thoracic inlet is also observed. Horses may also stand with their hind legs wide apart. Symptoms unique to guinea pigs include crouching with half-closed eyes and roughening of the hair. Treatment for milk sickness is typically symptom amelioration, as well as administration of laxatives, sodium lactate, glucose, or hypotonic Ringer's solution.

== Present day ==
Human milk sickness is uncommon today in the United States. Current practices of animal husbandry generally control the pastures and feed of cattle, and the pooling of milk from many producers lowers the risk of toxins being present in dangerous amounts. The toxins are not inactivated by pasteurization. Although extremely rare, milk sickness can occur if a person drinks contaminated milk or eats dairy products gathered from a single cow or from a smaller herd that has fed on the white snakeroot plant. There is no cure, but treatment is available. A study has shown that tremetol is likely not the singular cause of milk sickness, and that there are likely other chemicals that, in combination with tremetol, cause milk sickness.

== History ==
How could a disease, perhaps the leading cause of death and disability in the Midwest and Upper South for over two centuries, go unrecognized by the medical profession at large until 1928?

— William Snively, "Mystery of the milksick" (1967)

Milk sickness was suspected as a disease in the early 19th century as migrants moved into the Midwest; they first settled in areas bordering the Ohio River and its tributaries, which were their main transportation routes. They often grazed their cattle in frontier areas where white snakeroot grows; it is a member of the daisy family. They were unfamiliar with the plant and its properties. The high rate of fatalities from milk sickness made people fear it as they did the infectious diseases of cholera and yellow fever, whose causes were not understood at the time. Cattle do not graze on the plant unless other forage is not available. When pastures were scarce or in times of drought, the cattle would graze in woods, the habitat of white snakeroot. Early settlers often let their livestock roam freely in the woods.

Milk sickness was first described in writing in 1809, when Dr. Thomas Barbee of Bourbon County, Kentucky, detailed its symptoms. Variously described as "the trembles", "the slows", or as the illness "under which man turns sick and his domestic animals tremble," it was a frequent cause of illness and death. The fatality rate was so high that sometimes half the people in a frontier settlement might die of milk sickness. Doctors used their contemporary treatment of bloodletting, but it had little success as it was unrelated to the cause of the illness.

Cases were identified in Ohio, Kentucky, Tennessee, Indiana, and Illinois. The illness was particularly ruinous in Henderson County, Kentucky, along the banks of the Green River. Because of the losses from the illness, in 1830 the Kentucky General Assembly offered a $600 reward to anyone discovering its cause. Many scientists in the area tried to determine the cause of the illness but without success. Farmers found that only clearing the riverbanks and grazing cattle on tended fields ended the occurrence of milk sickness.

American medical science did not officially identify the cause of milk sickness as the white snakeroot plant until 1928, when advances in biochemistry enabled the analysis of the plant's toxin. Dr. Anna Pierce Hobbs is credited in the 21st century as the first person to learn the specific cause of the illness back in the 1830s. Hobbs had migrated as a girl to the Illinois country with her parents. She returned to Philadelphia, Pennsylvania, to study medicine: her studies included nursing, midwifery and dental extraction, the sum of what women at the time could study in medicine. After her return to southern Illinois, she started practicing and also worked as a teacher. When milk sickness broke out, Hobbs studied the characteristics of the illness and noted the results in her diary. She determined that it occurred seasonally, beginning in summer and continuing until the first frost. She noted that it was more prominent in cattle than in other animals and thought it might be caused by a plant which the cattle were eating. The legend says that while following the cattle in search of the cause, Hobbs happened upon an elderly Shawnee woman, whom she befriended. During their conversations, the Shawnee told her that the white snakeroot plant caused milk sickness in humans. Hobbs tested this by feeding the plant to a calf and observed its poisonous properties when the animal died; she had fed other plants to other calves that survived. With that evidence, she gathered members of her community to eradicate the plant from their settlement. Although Hobbs learned valuable information from the Shawnee woman and did additional study to demonstrate proof of it, by her death in 1869, she had received no official credit from the medical community for her writing about milk sickness.

== Notable possible victims ==
- Nancy Hanks Lincoln, who died in 1818, was the mother of Abraham Lincoln.
