= Tremetone =

Names
- Preferred IUPAC name 1-[(2R)-2-(Prop-1-en-2-yl)-2,3-dihydro-1-benzofuran-5-yl]propan-1-one

Identifiers
CAS Number	4976-25-4
3D model (JSmol)	Interactive image
ChemSpider	71024
PubChem CID	78673
UNII	451MA27V7H
CompTox Dashboard (EPA)	DTXSID501031865
- InChI: InChI=1S/C13H14O2/c1-8(2)13-7-11-6-10(9(3)14)4-5-12(11)15-13/h4-6,13H,1,7H2,2-3H3/t13-/m1/s1 Key: UVYUUQGGBNKRFU-CYBMUJFWSA-N
- SMILES: O=C(C1=CC=C(O[C@@H](C(C)=C)C2)C2=C1)C

Properties
Chemical formula	C_{13}H_{14}O_{2}
Molar mass	202.253 g·mol^{−1}
- Except where otherwise noted, data are given for materials in their standard state (at 25 °C [77 °F], 100 kPa). Infobox references

Tremetone is a constituent of the toxic compound tremetol, found in snakeroot (Ageratina altissima), that contributes to cause milk sickness in humans and trembles in livestock. Tremetone is the main constituent of at least 11 chemically related substances in tremetol. Tremetone is toxic to fish, but not to chicken, and is therefore not the major toxic compound in tremetol. Tremetol can be found in a number of different species of the family Asteraceae, including snakeroot and rayless goldenrod (Isocoma pluriflora).

== Synthesis ==
Tremetol, an oil with a straw-colored tinge, was first isolated from white snakeroot by J.F. Couch in 1929. Column chromatography of tremetol yielded a hydrocarbon, two steroids, and three ketones. Further isolation experiments revealed that tremetone is the major ketone constituent of the compound tremetol. Hence, tremetone was hypothesized to be responsible for the “trembles” that characterize the milk sickness disease. Tremetone was first synthesized in July 1963 by DeGraw, Bowen, and Bonner. This synthesis is illustrated below. The final dehydration step was accomplished by treatment with phosphoryl chloride/pyridine at 75 °C.

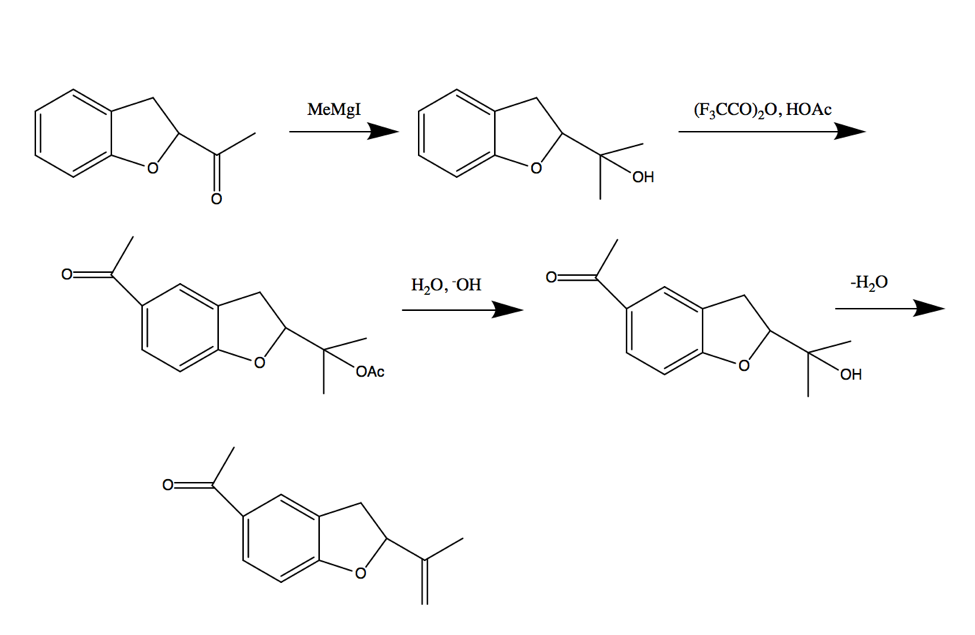
4-step synthesis of racemic tremetone

This synthesis had a 75% yield, but the final product was a racemate that would not suitably undergo chiral resolution. This prevented isolation of the natural levorotary enantiomer of tremetone; thus limiting the ability to further analyze its biological mechanisms. However, in November 1963, the enantiomers of tremetone were isolated by Bowen, et al. via the synthesis illustrated below. Resolution of enantiomers occurred by co-crystallization of the acid following Na/Hg reduction.

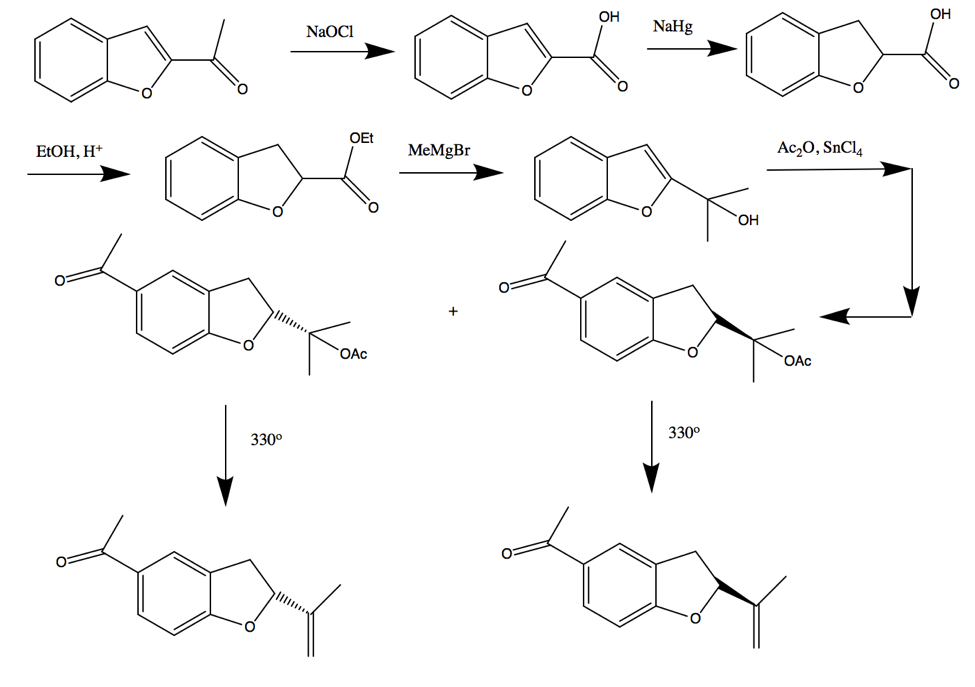
Synthesis (Enantiomeric)

== See also ==
- Milk sickness
- Snakeroot (Ageratina altissima)
- Toxol, a structurally related substance (3-hydroxy-tremetone)
