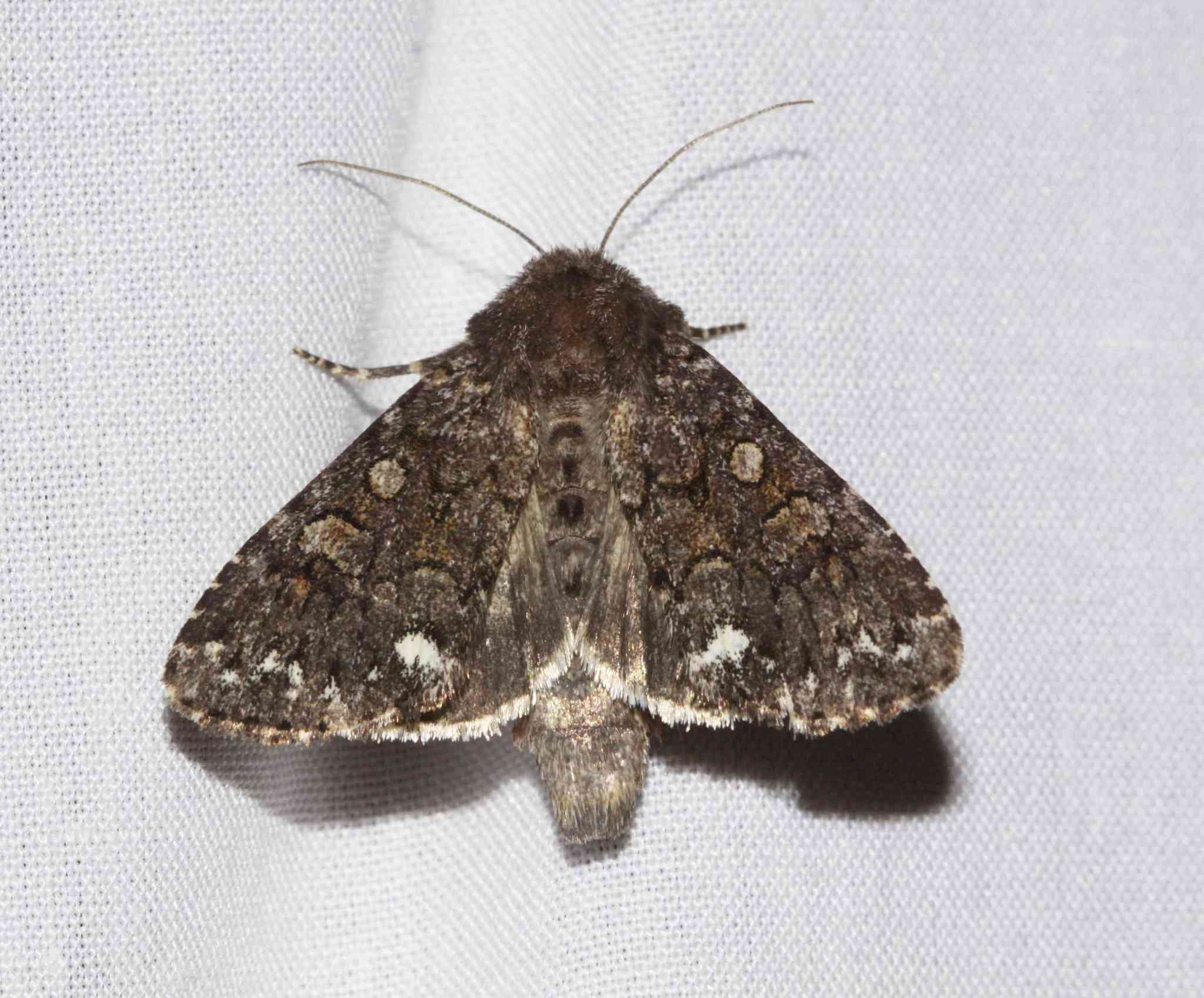

Scientific classification
- Domain: Eukaryota
- Kingdom: Animalia
- Phylum: Arthropoda
- Class: Insecta
- Order: Lepidoptera
- Superfamily: Noctuoidea
- Family: Noctuidae
- Tribe: Hadenini
- Genus: Melanchra
- Species: M. pulverulenta

Binomial name
- Melanchra pulverulenta (Smith, 1888)

= Melanchra pulverulenta =

Species of moth

Melanchra pulverulenta is a species of cutworm or dart moth in the family Noctuidae. It is found in North America.
