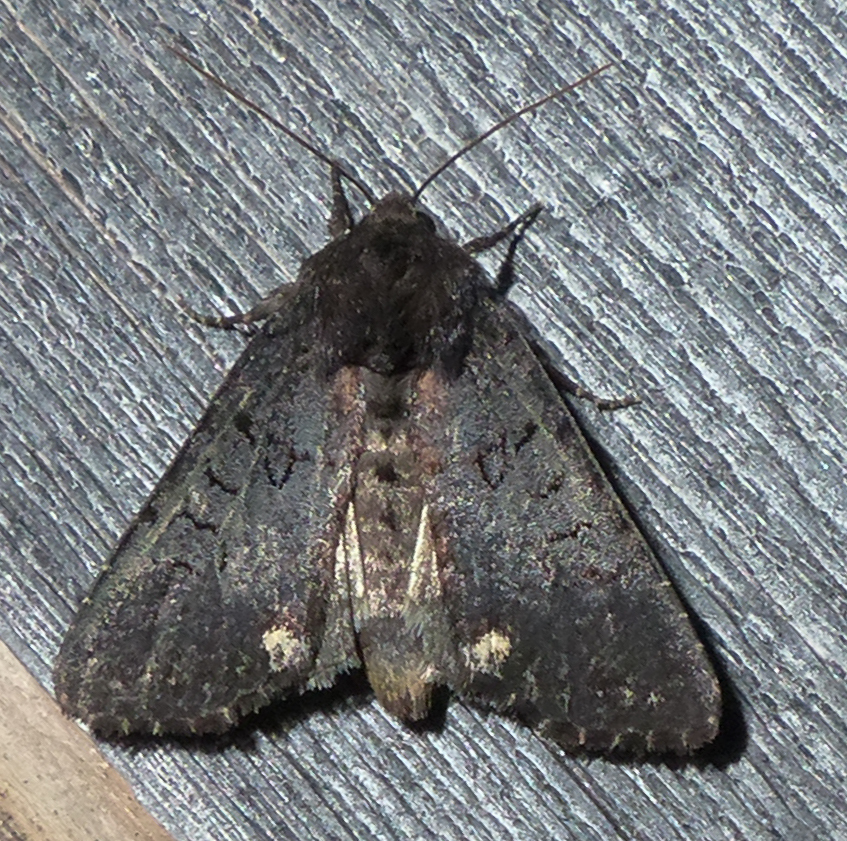

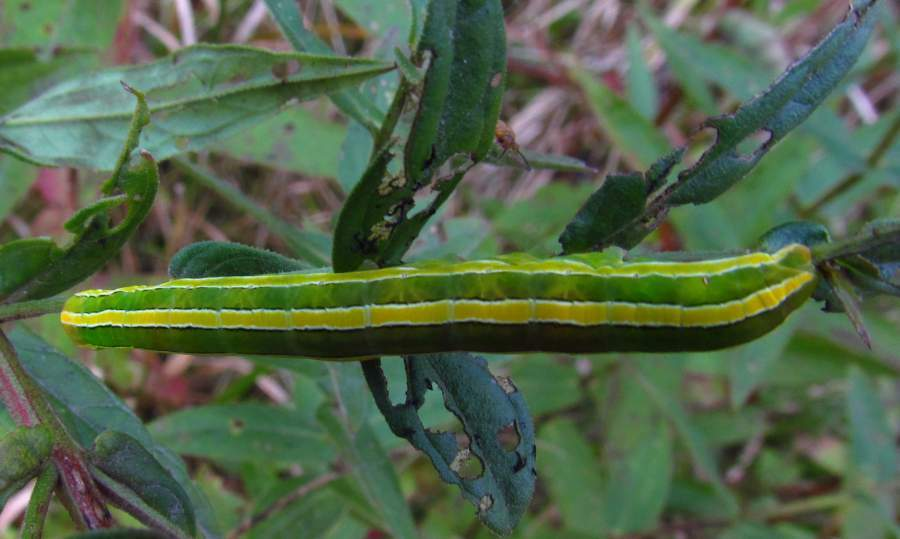
- Adult (top) and larva (bottom)

Scientific classification
- Domain: Eukaryota
- Kingdom: Animalia
- Phylum: Arthropoda
- Class: Insecta
- Order: Lepidoptera
- Superfamily: Noctuoidea
- Family: Noctuidae
- Tribe: Hadenini
- Genus: Melanchra
- Species: M. assimilis

Binomial name
- Melanchra assimilis (Morrison, 1874)

= Melanchra assimilis =

Species of moth

Melanchra assimilis, commonly known as the black arches or similar black noctuid, is a species of cutworm or dart moth in the family Noctuidae. It is found in North America.

The MONA or Hodges number for Melanchra assimilis is 10295.
