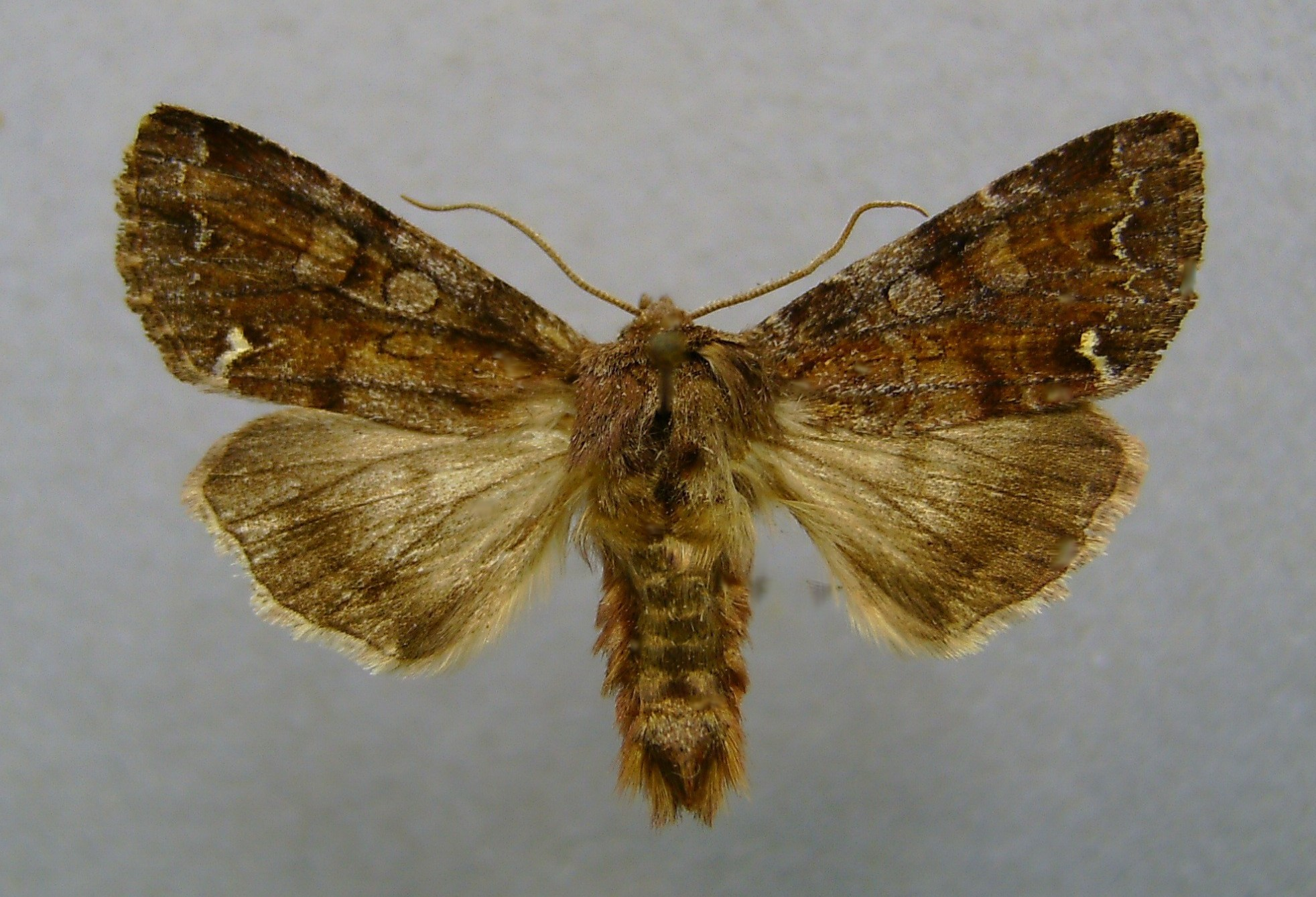

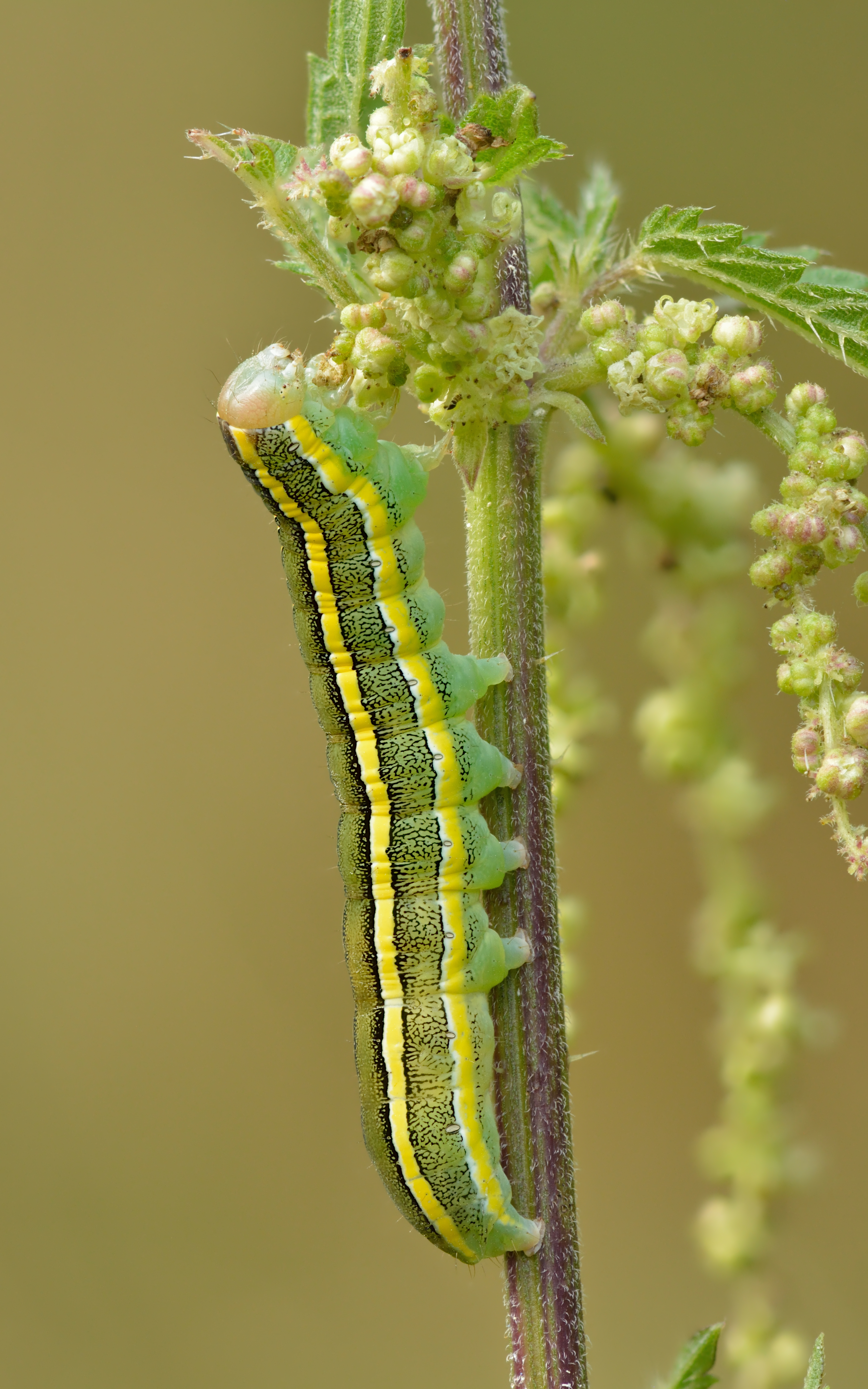

Scientific classification
- Kingdom: Animalia
- Phylum: Arthropoda
- Class: Insecta
- Order: Lepidoptera
- Superfamily: Noctuoidea
- Family: Noctuidae
- Genus: Ceramica
- Species: C. pisi

Binomial name
- Ceramica pisi (Linnaeus, 1758)

Synonyms
- Melanchra pisi

= Ceramica pisi =

Broom moth

Species of moth

Ceramica pisi, the broom moth, is a moth of the family Noctuidae. It is found in all of Europe, East across the Palearctic to Siberia and the Russian Far East. In the north, it is found far beyond the Arctic Circle and in the south to northern Spain. In the Alps, it is found at heights of up to 2,000 metres.

== Description ==
The wingspan is 32–37 mm. The length of the forewings is 16–20 mm. Forewing red brown much mottled with darker; median shade prominently darker; the wavy whitish submarginal line forming a conspicuous white triangle on submedian fold; upper stigmata pale grey; claviform small, black-edged; hindwing dull fuscous, the basal half paler, with dark veins and lunule;- in splendens Stph. the brown tint is predominant and the markings are obscured; — in rufa Tutt, with the markings also obscured, the red tint overpowers the brown; while pallens Stgr. is pale yellowish grey brown, with the markings indistinct; this form is found in W. Turkestan and also in Iceland; – scotica Tutt is a dark purplish grey form from Scotland and England, Finland, Lapland, and E. Siberia.

== Biology ==
The moth flies in two generations from mid-May to August..

Larva purple brown or brownish green, with four deep yellow stripes of uniform width; the head, feet, and venter flesh colour. The larvae feed on various shrubs, deciduous trees and herbaceous plants, such as heather (Calluna sp.), broom (Cytisus scoparius), bracken (Pteridium aquilinum), bramble (Rubus sp.), sea-buckthorn (Hippophae sp.), willow (Salix sp.) and the European larch (Larix decidua).

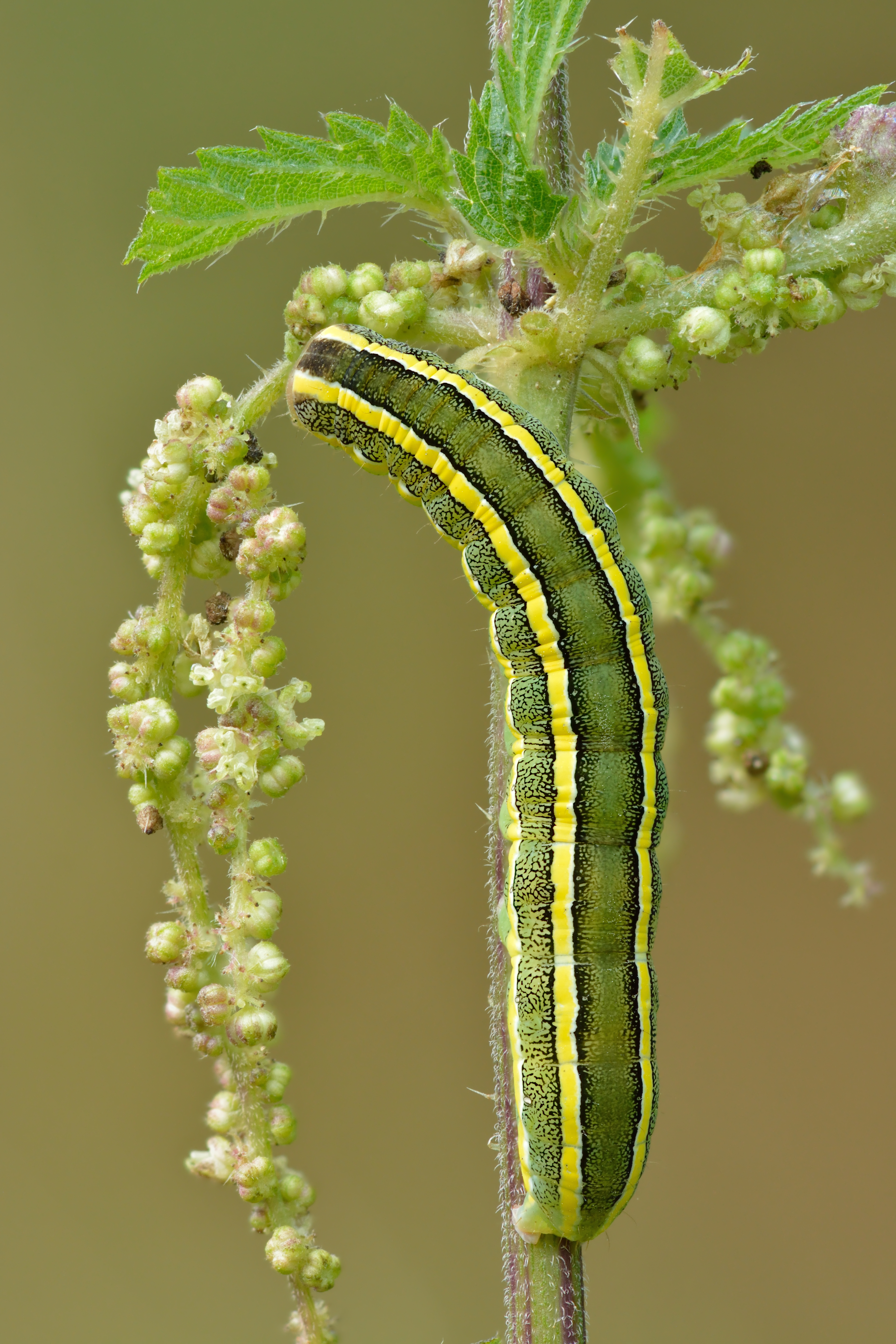
Caterpillar (top view)

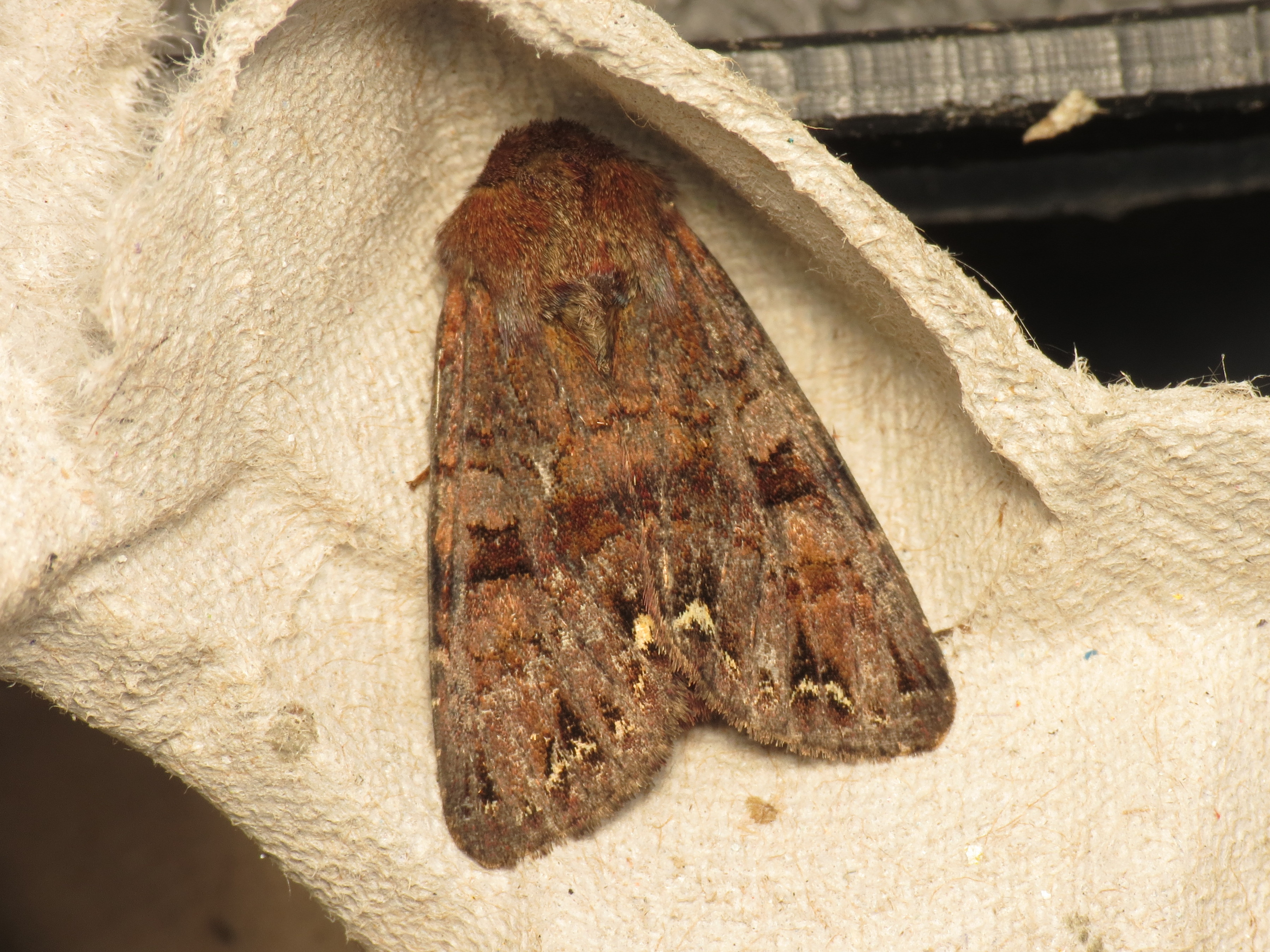

== Notes ==
1. The flight season refers to Belgium and The Netherlands. This may vary in other parts of the range.
