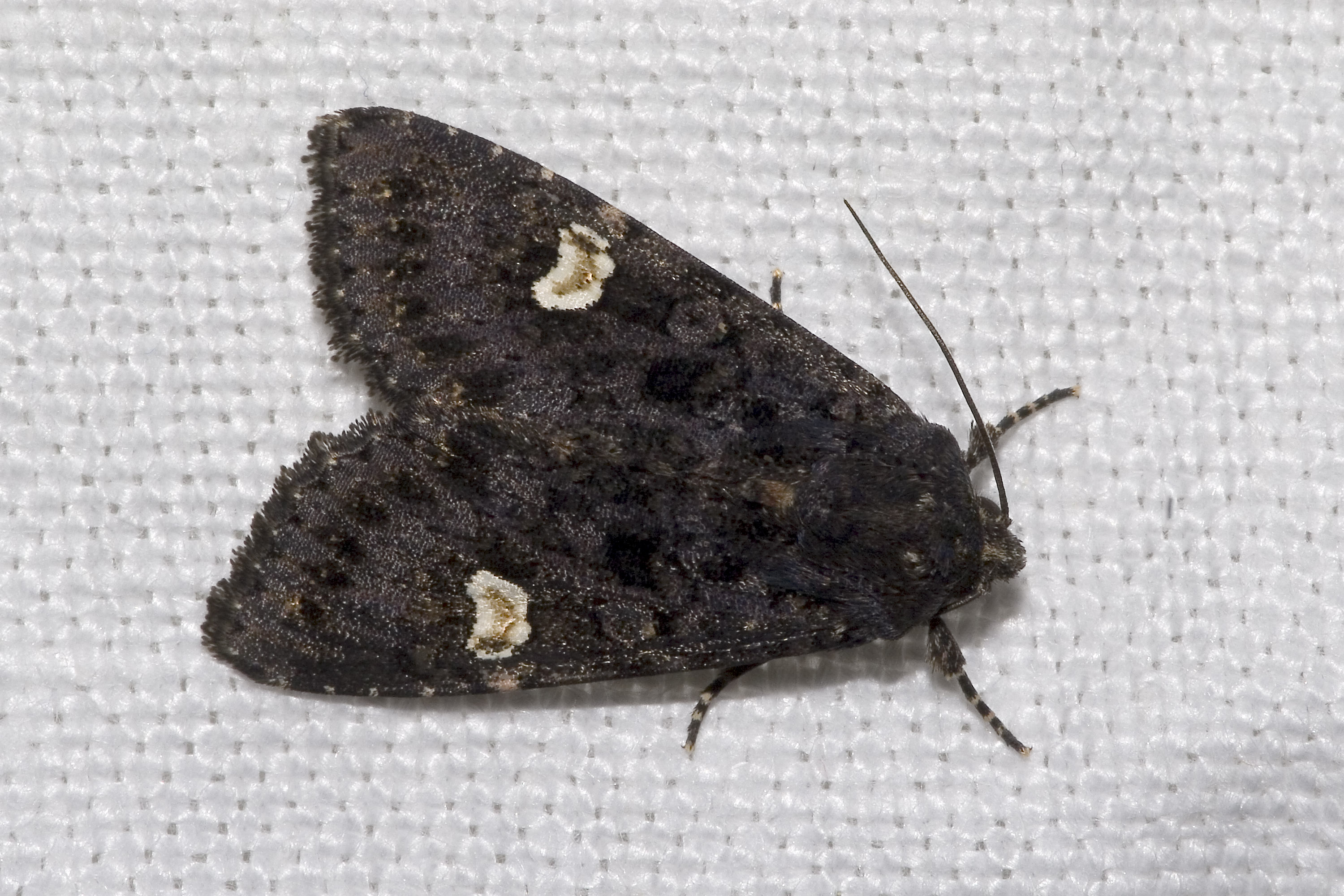

Scientific classification
- Kingdom: Animalia
- Phylum: Arthropoda
- Clade: Pancrustacea
- Class: Insecta
- Order: Lepidoptera
- Superfamily: Noctuoidea
- Family: Noctuidae
- Genus: Melanchra
- Species: M. persicariae

Binomial name
- Melanchra persicariae (Linnaeus, 1761)

= Dot moth =

Species of moth

The dot moth (Melanchra persicariae) is a moth of the family Noctuidae. The species was first described by Carl Linnaeus in 1761. It is a very distinctive species with very dark brown, almost black, forewings marked with a large white stigma from which the species gets its common name. The hindwings are grey with a dark band at the termen. The wingspan is 38–50 mm. It flies at night in July and August and is attracted to light, sugar and flowers.

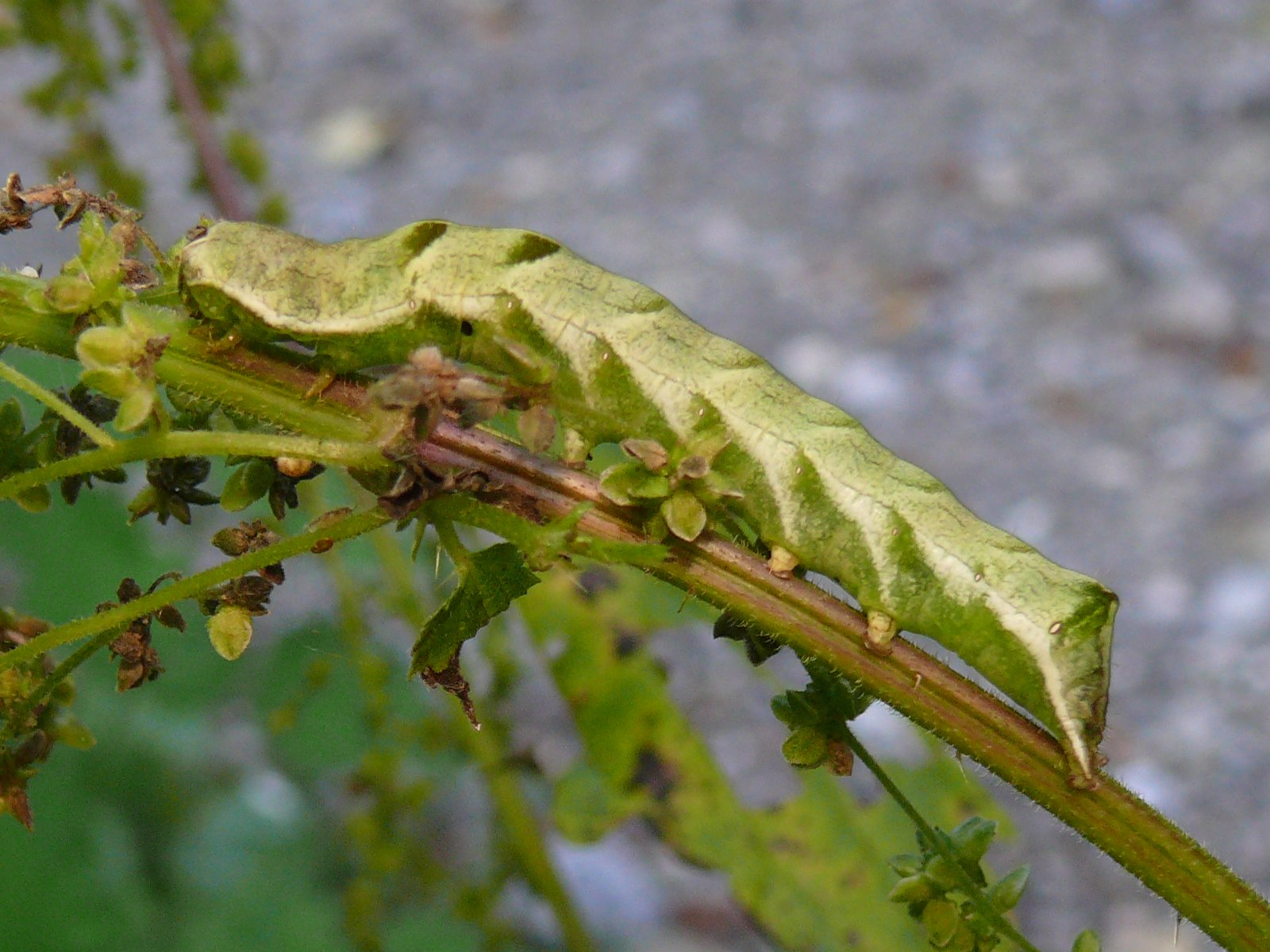
Larva

== Distribution ==
The distribution area ranges from Spain in the west to Korea and Japan. It is found throughout Europe apart from the south-east. To the north it is found in Scotland and southern Fennoscandia, east through southern Russia, the Russian Far East and Siberia and Central Asia to the Kamchatka Peninsula. Then northern China to Korea and Japan. The southern boundary runs through northern Spain, Italy (except for Sicily), Macedonia, Bulgaria, Asia Minor, the southern Caucasus, northern Iran. In the Alps it rises up to about 1000 m.

== Technical description and variation ==
Seitz, 1914, notes "forewing purplish black; the lines and edges of stigmata blacker; reniform filled up with cream white round a rufous centre; submarginal line yellowish white broken up into spots preceded by black wedgeshaped marks; hindwing dirty whitish with broad blackish terminal border; the veins and cellspot blackish; fringe paler. — ab. accipitrina Esp. has the reniform dark with a slight paler external border; it does not occur in Britain, though common in Europe, nor have I seen it from Japan, but Oberthur records it from Askold Island." See also Hacker et al.

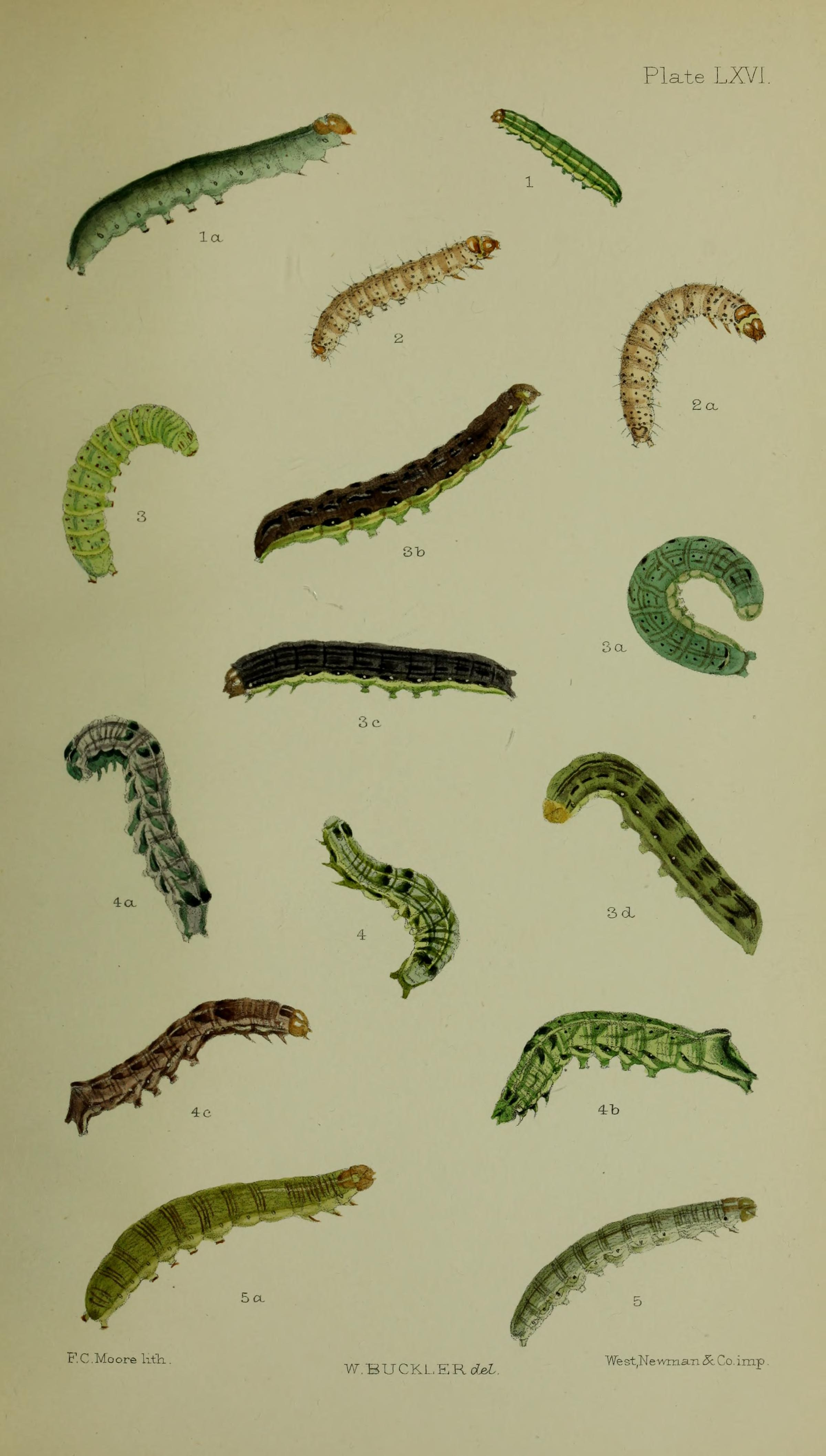
Figs 4, 4a, 4b, 4c, 4d larva after last moult

The larva is rather variable in colour, being green, brown or even purplish or pinkish; dorsal line pale; a series of thick green V-shaped marks on dorsum, those on 4, 5, and 11 broader, the 11th segment humped; marked with lighter than the ground colour diagonal markings. It is polyphagous, feeding on a wide variety of plants (see list below). The species overwinters as a pupa.

== Recorded food plants ==
- Aconitum
- Actaea
- Aegopodium – ground-elder
- Alnus – grey alder
- Aquilegia – columbine
- Betula – silver birch
- Calluna – heather
- Campanula
- Cirsium – creeping thistle
- Delphinium
- Hieracium – hawkweed
- Impatiens – touch-me-not balsam
- Larix – larch
- Lupinus – lupin
- Lysimachia – yellow loosestrife
- Petunia
- Phlox
- Polygonum
- Prunus – bird cherry
- Pteridium – bracken
- Quercus – holm oak
- Ribes – currant
- Rubus – raspberry
- Rudbeckia
- Salix – willow
- Sambucus – elder
- Solidago – goldenrods
- Sorbus – rowan
- Spinacia – spinach
- Tagetes
- Tropaeolum – nasturtium
- Urtica – nettle
- Vaccinium – bilberry

See Robinson, G. S. et al.

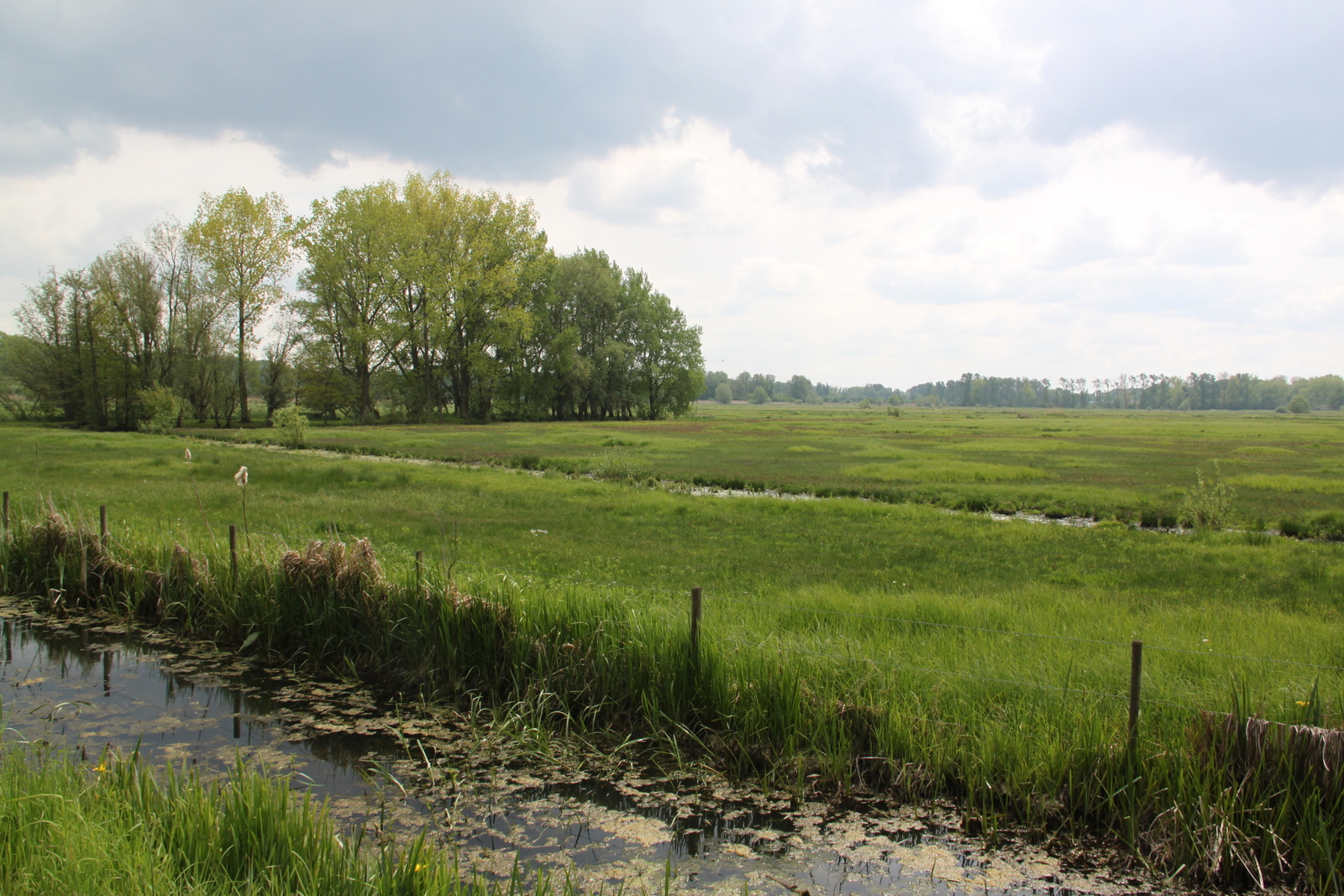
Habitat in Belgium

== Habitat ==
Melanchra persicariae occupies a wide range of habitats including woodland, field or meadow edges, hedgerows and gardens

== Notes ==
1. The flight season refers to the British Isles. This may vary in other parts of the range.
