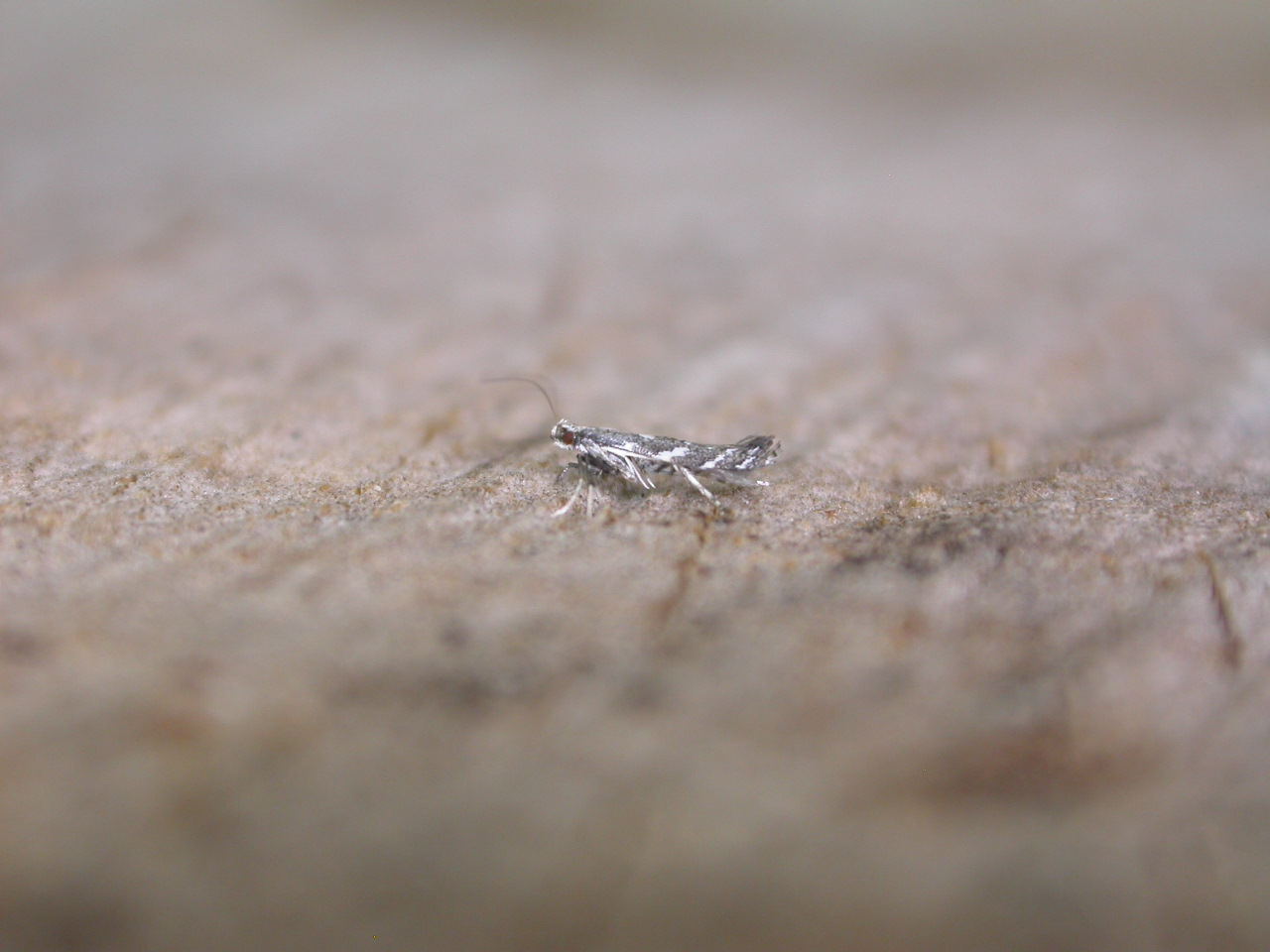

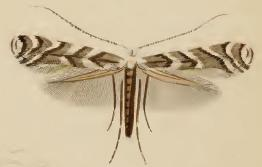

Scientific classification
- Kingdom: Animalia
- Phylum: Arthropoda
- Clade: Pancrustacea
- Class: Insecta
- Order: Lepidoptera
- Family: Gracillariidae
- Genus: Leucospilapteryx
- Species: L. omissella

Binomial name
- Leucospilapteryx omissella (Stainton, 1848)

Synonyms
- Argyromiges omissella Stainton, 1848; Gracilaria omissella; Euspilapteryx omissella; Acrocercops omissella; Dryadula ainoniella Matsumura, 1931; Leucospilapteryx ainoniella

= Leucospilapteryx omissella =

Species of moth

Leucospilapteryx omissella is a moth of the family Gracillariidae. It is known from all of Europe (except Ireland and the Balkan Peninsula), east through Russia to Japan.

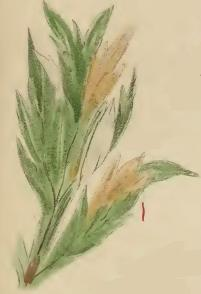
A sprig of Artemisia vulgaris with mined leaves

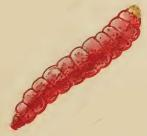
Larva

The wingspan is 7–8 mm. Adults are on wing in May and again in August in two generations.

The larvae feed on Artemisia campestris and Artemisia vulgaris. They mine the leaves of their host plant. Pupation takes place outside of the mine.
