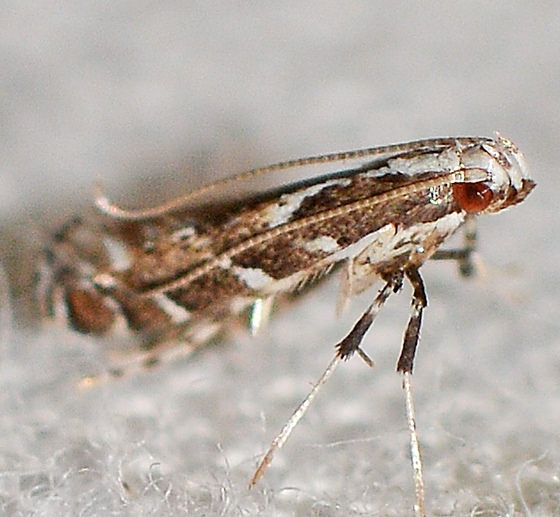

Scientific classification
- Domain: Eukaryota
- Kingdom: Animalia
- Phylum: Arthropoda
- Class: Insecta
- Order: Lepidoptera
- Family: Gracillariidae
- Subfamily: Acrocercopinae
- Genus: Leucospilapteryx; Spuler, 1910

Species
- See text

= Leucospilapteryx =

Genus of moths

Leucospilapteryx is a genus of moths in the family Gracillariidae.

== Species ==
- Leucospilapteryx anaphalidis Kumata, 1965
- Leucospilapteryx omissella (Stainton, 1848)
- Leucospilapteryx venustella (Clemens, 1860)
