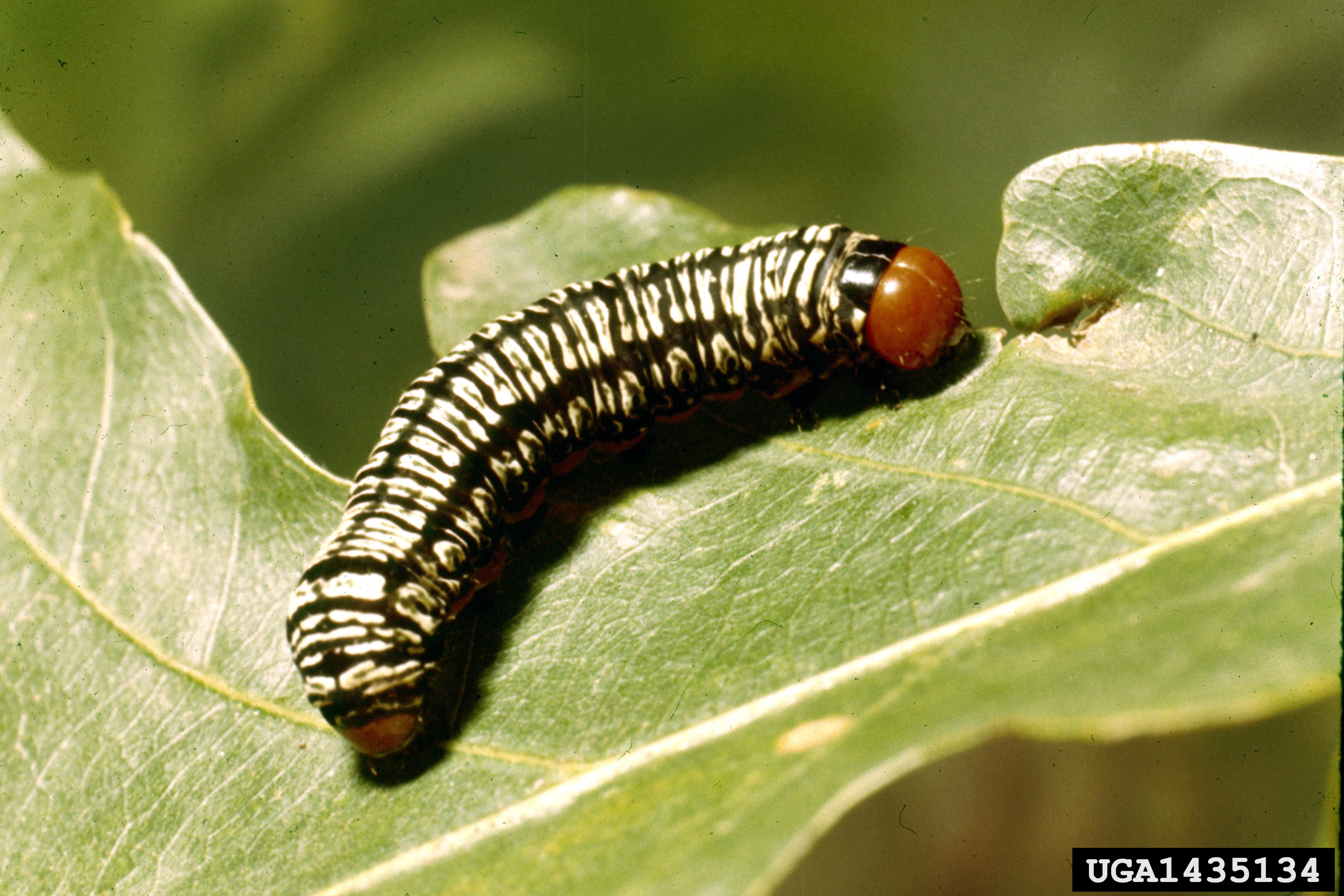

Scientific classification
- Kingdom: Animalia
- Phylum: Arthropoda
- Class: Insecta
- Order: Lepidoptera
- Superfamily: Noctuoidea
- Family: Noctuidae
- Genus: Melanchra
- Species: M. picta

Binomial name
- Melanchra picta Harris, 1841

Synonyms
- Ceramica picta (Harris, 1841); Melanchra contraria Walker, 1856; Melanchra exusta Guenée, 1852

= Zebra caterpillar =

Species of moth

The zebra caterpillar is the larva of an American noctuid moth (Melanchra picta) that feeds on cabbages, beets and other cultivated plants.

The head, thorax, and forewings of adults are chestnut- or reddish-brown, usually with purplish brown mottling on the wings. The whitish hind wings have pale brown margins. The abdomen is light gray. The wingspan is 35 to 40 mm (1.4 to 1.6 in).

The newly hatched larvae are whitish, marked by dark heads and several dark spots scattered over the body. The more mature caterpillars vary in color, often displaying bright and conspicuous hues, usually with prominent black and light yellow longitudinal stripes. The top stripe is black, the top-lateral stripe and the stripe below the spiracles are cream to bright yellow, and the spiracle stripe and bottom stripe are black and marked with numerous white lines and spots. The mid-dorsal line is pale and may be well developed or absent. The underside and legs are light red-brown or yellow. The head is reddish or reddish-brown and without dark arcs or reticulations. Larvae are 35 to 40 mm (1.4 to 1.6 in) long when mature.

The larvae first feed in small compact groups until molting, after which they scatter throughout the foliage. They feed during the day. When disturbed on foliage, they roll up and fall to the ground.

Zebra caterpillars thrive throughout the United States. Known as general feeders in the western states, they usually become pests in late summer. This caterpillar often exists in a mixed population with the bertha armyworm and the variegated cutworm.
