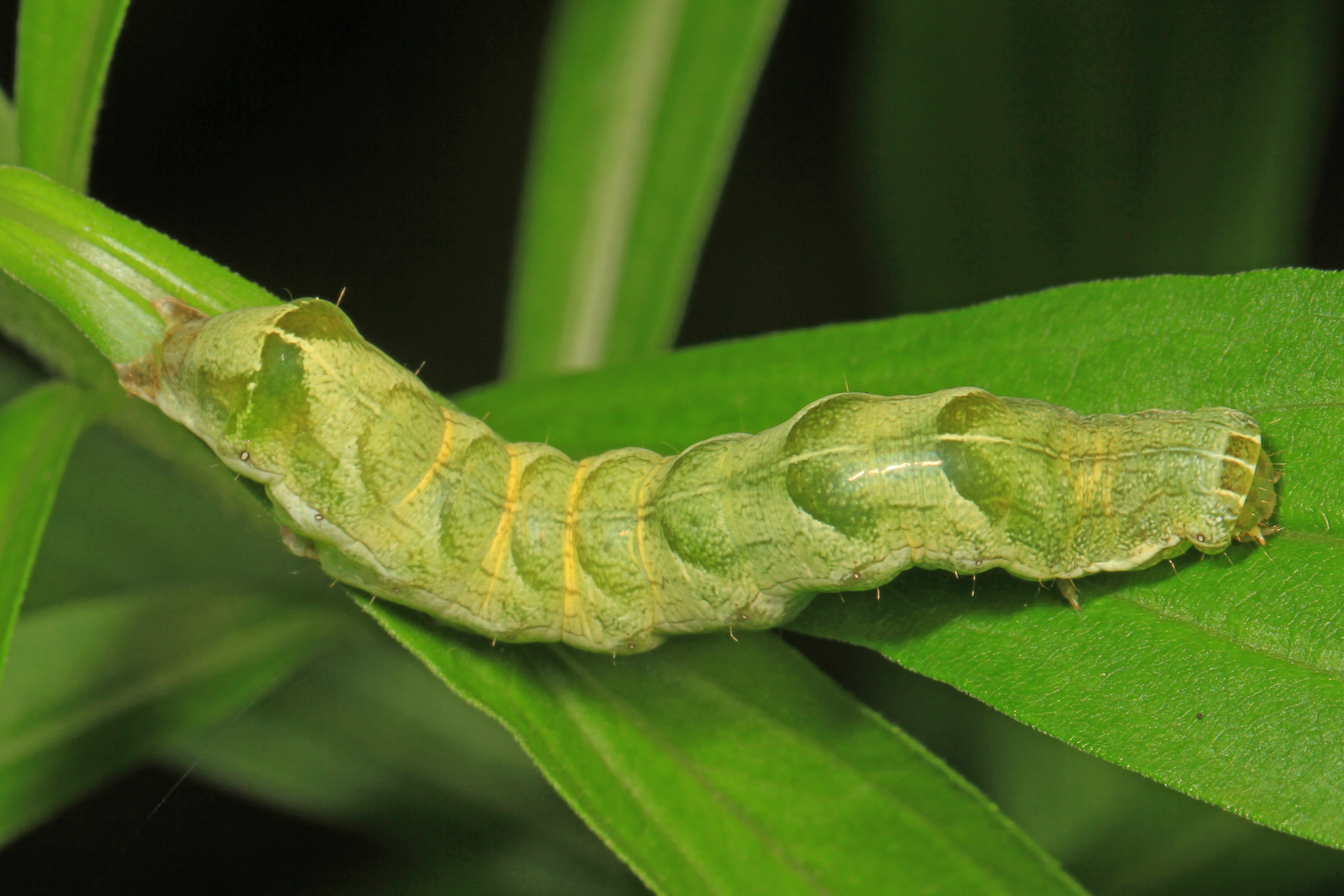

Scientific classification
- Kingdom: Animalia
- Phylum: Arthropoda
- Clade: Pancrustacea
- Class: Insecta
- Order: Lepidoptera
- Superfamily: Noctuoidea
- Family: Noctuidae
- Tribe: Hadenini
- Genus: Melanchra
- Species: M. adjuncta

Binomial name
- Melanchra adjuncta (Guenée, 1852)

= Melanchra adjuncta =

Species of moth

Melanchra adjuncta, the hitched arch, is a species of cutworm or dart moth in the family Noctuidae. It is found in North America.
