= Toxol =

Names
- Preferred IUPAC name 1-[(2S,3R)-3-Hydroxy-2-(prop-1-en-2-yl)-2,3-dihydro-1-benzofuran-5-yl]ethan-1-one

Identifiers
CAS Number	26296-56-0
3D model (JSmol)	Interactive image
ChEBI	CHEBI:9645
ChemSpider	390520
KEGG	C08979
PubChem CID	441948
UNII	YQX3QAA4JL
CompTox Dashboard (EPA)	DTXSID70949159
- InChI: InChI=1S/C13H14O3/c1-7(2)13-12(15)10-6-9(8(3)14)4-5-11(10)16-13/h4-6,12-13,15H,1H2,2-3H3/t12-,13+/m1/s1 Key: KWZYQHQNOWRQRG-OLZOCXBDSA-N; InChI=1/C13H14O3/c1-7(2)13-12(15)10-6-9(8(3)14)4-5-11(10)16-13/h4-6,12-13,15H,1H2,2-3H3/t12-,13+/m1/s1 Key: KWZYQHQNOWRQRG-OLZOCXBDBE
- SMILES: O=C(c2cc1c(O[C@@H](\C(=C)C)[C@@H]1O)cc2)C

Properties
Chemical formula	C_{13}H_{14}O_{3}
Molar mass	218.252 g·mol^{−1}
- Except where otherwise noted, data are given for materials in their standard state (at 25 °C [77 °F], 100 kPa). Infobox references

Toxol is a toxic organic compound classified as a benzofuran derivative with the molecular formula C_{13}H_{14}O_{3}. It is naturally found in plants such as Aplopappus heterophyllus and Werneria ciliolata. Its IUPAC name is 1-[(2S,3R)-3-hydroxy-2-prop-1-en-2-yl-2,3-dihydro-1-benzofuran-5-yl]ethanone. This compound is toxic and related chemically to tremetone

== See also ==
- Tremetone, a closely related substance
