= Helianthus navarri =

Scientific classification
- Kingdom: Plantae
- Clade: Tracheophytes
- Clade: Angiosperms
- Clade: Eudicots
- Clade: Asterids
- Order: Asterales
- Family: Asteraceae
- Genus: Helianthus
- Species: H. navarri

Binomial name
- Helianthus navarri Phil.

Synonyms
- Flourensia navarri (Phil.) Reiche

Species of sunflower

Helianthus navarri is a species of sunflower in the family Asteraceae. It is native to Chile in South America.
