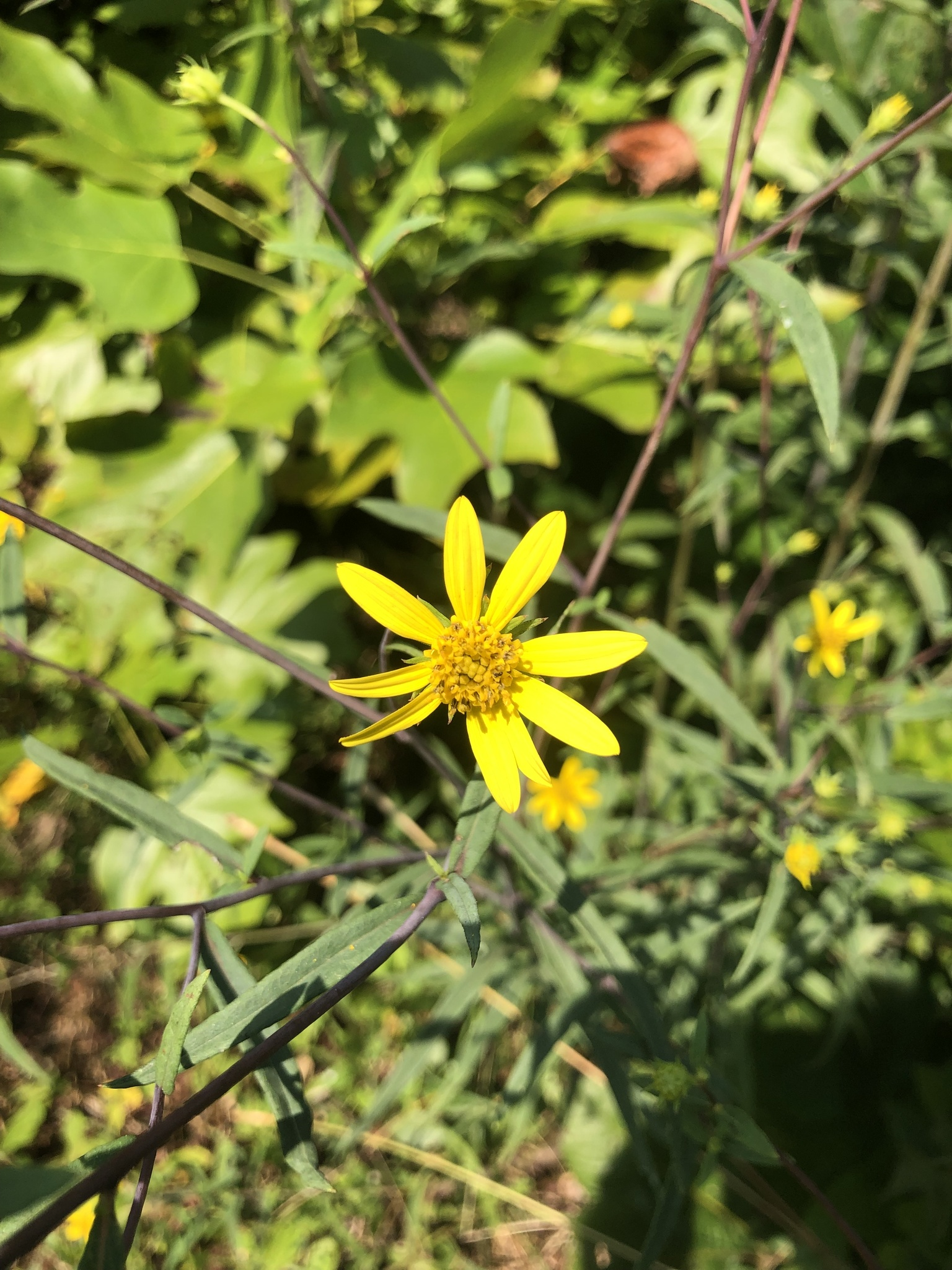

Scientific classification
- Kingdom: Plantae
- Clade: Embryophytes
- Clade: Tracheophytes
- Clade: Spermatophytes
- Clade: Angiosperms
- Clade: Eudicots
- Clade: Asterids
- Order: Asterales
- Family: Asteraceae
- Tribe: Heliantheae
- Genus: Helianthus
- Species: H. laevigatus

Binomial name
- Helianthus laevigatus Torr. & A.Gray

Synonyms
- Helianthus mollis var. cordatus S.Watson; Helianthus reindutus (E.S.Steele) E.Watson; Helianthus laevigatus subsp. reindutus (E.S.Steele) E.S.Steele

= Helianthus laevigatus =

Species of sunflower

Helianthus laevigatus is a North American species of sunflower known by the common name smooth sunflower. It is native to the east-central and southeastern United States from Georgia to Maryland.

Helianthus laevigatus is a perennial herb up to 220 cm (over 7 feet) tall, spreading by means of underground rhizomes. Most of the leaves are on the stem rather than crowded around the base, each leaf up to 15 cm (6 inches) long. Leaves and stems generally have no hairs, and the undersides of the leaves sometimes appear pale because of a layer of wax on the surface. One plant usually produces 1-6 flower heads. Each head has 5-10 yellow ray florets surrounding 40 or more yellow disc florets. The plant grows on soils derived from shale.
