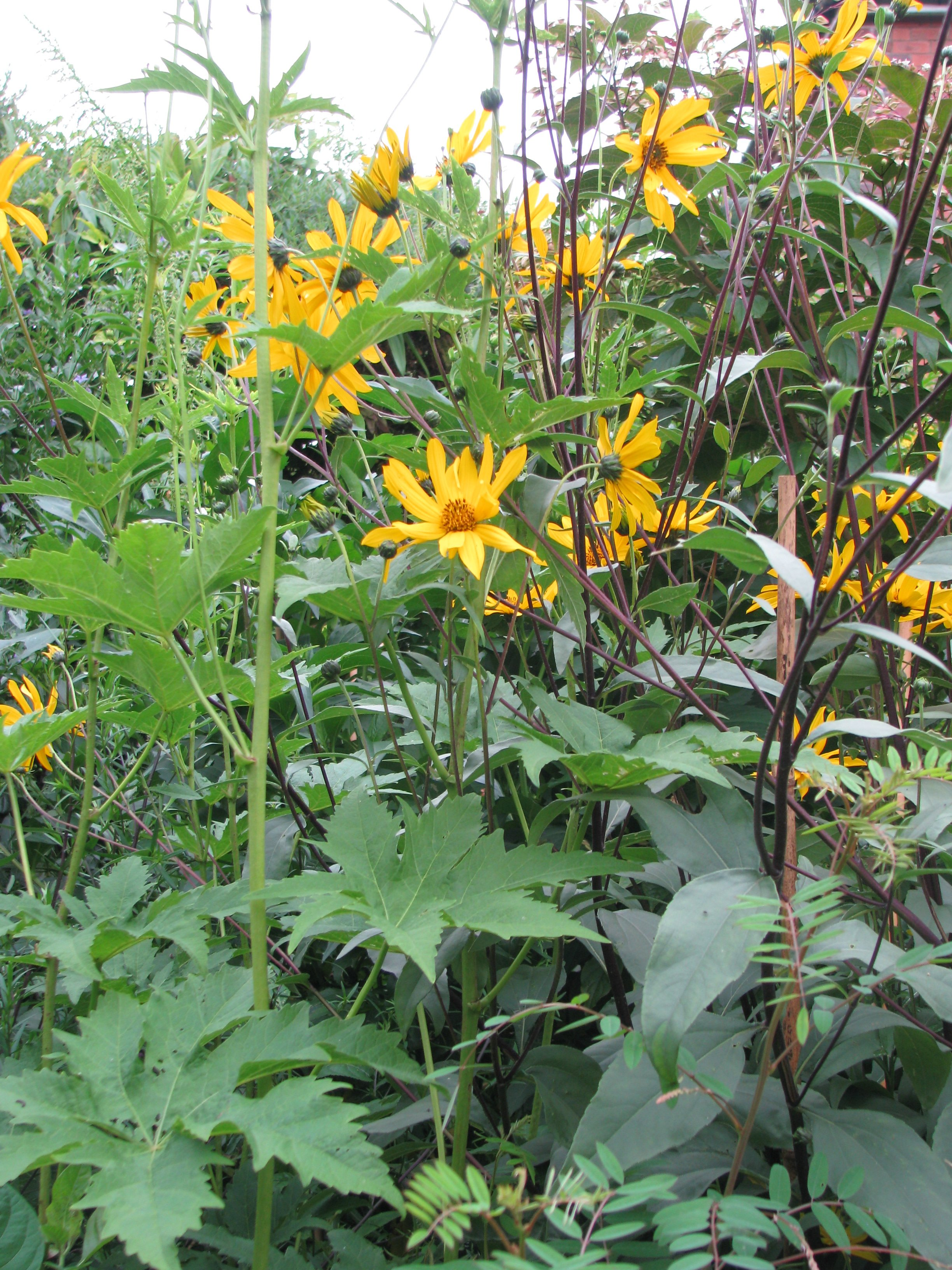

Conservation status
- Least Concern (IUCN 3.1)

Scientific classification
- Kingdom: Plantae
- Clade: Embryophytes
- Clade: Tracheophytes
- Clade: Spermatophytes
- Clade: Angiosperms
- Clade: Eudicots
- Clade: Asterids
- Order: Asterales
- Family: Asteraceae
- Tribe: Heliantheae
- Genus: Helianthus
- Species: H. atrorubens

Binomial name
- Helianthus atrorubens L. 1753 not Lam. 1789

Synonyms
- Discomela atrorubens Raf.; Discomela sparsiflorus Raf.; Helianthus sparsifolius Elliott; Echinomeria apetala (Torr. ex Nutt.) Nutt.; Rudbeckia apetala Torr. ex Nutt.

= Helianthus atrorubens =

Species of sunflower

Helianthus atrorubens is a North American species of sunflower known by the common name purpledisc sunflower. It is native to the southeastern United States. It is found in all the coastal states from Louisiana to Virginia, plus the inland states of Kentucky and Tennessee.

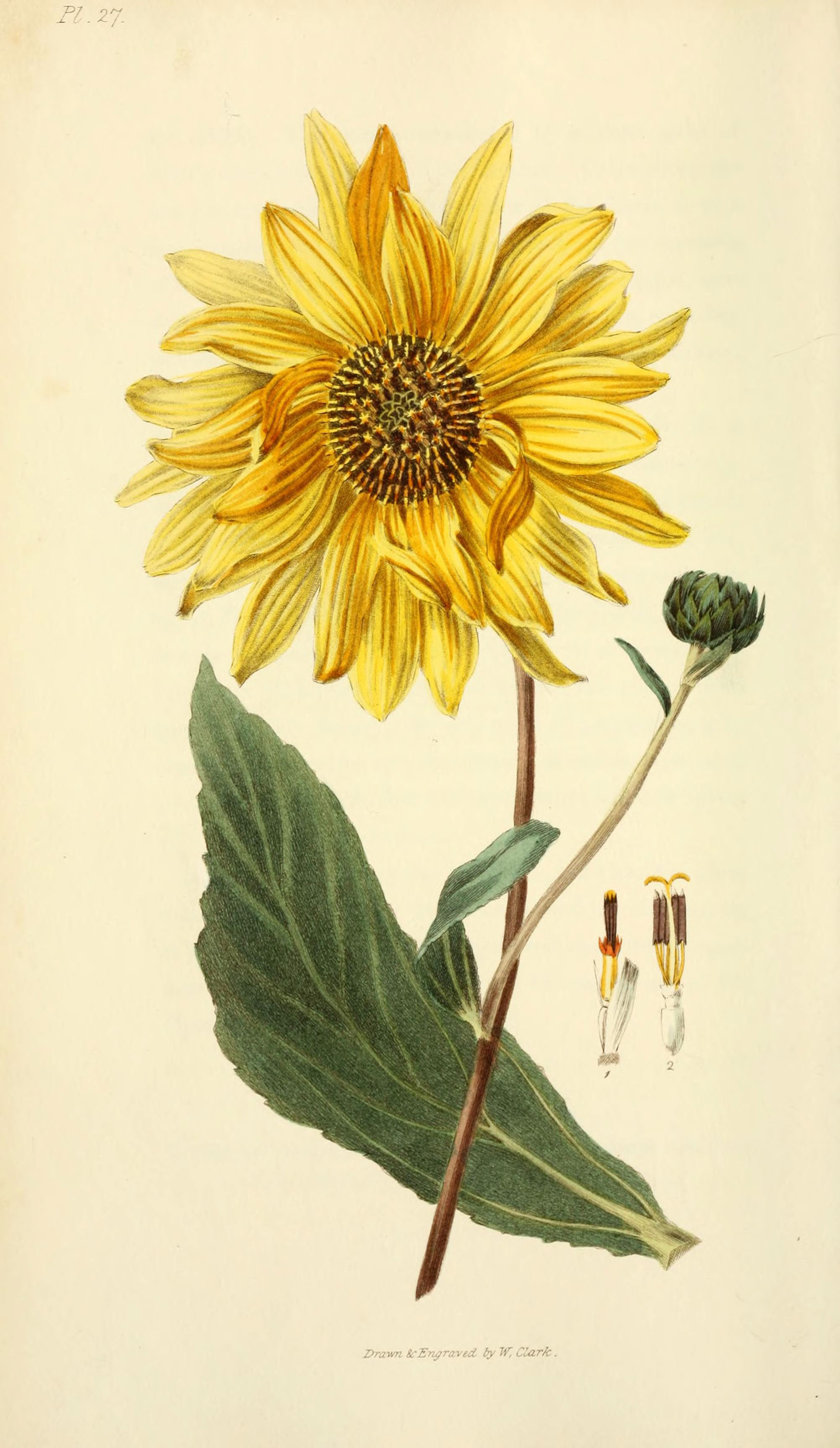
Illustration showing details of plant.

Helianthus atrorubens is a perennial herb sometimes as much as 200 cm (6 ft 7 in) tall. Most of the leaves are close to the base of the stem. One plant can produce 1-15 flower heads, each with 10-15 yellow ray florets surrounding 75 or more red or purple disc florets. The plant grows in mixed woods and along roadsides.
