= Helianthus sarmentosus =

Scientific classification
- Kingdom: Plantae
- Clade: Tracheophytes
- Clade: Angiosperms
- Clade: Eudicots
- Clade: Asterids
- Order: Asterales
- Family: Asteraceae
- Genus: Helianthus
- Species: H. sarmentosus

Binomial name
- Helianthus sarmentosus Rich.

Synonyms
- Chylodia sarmentosa (Rich.) Rich. ex Cass.

Species of sunflower

Helianthus sarmentosus is a species of sunflower in the family Asteraceae. It is native to French Guiana, part of the French Republic.
