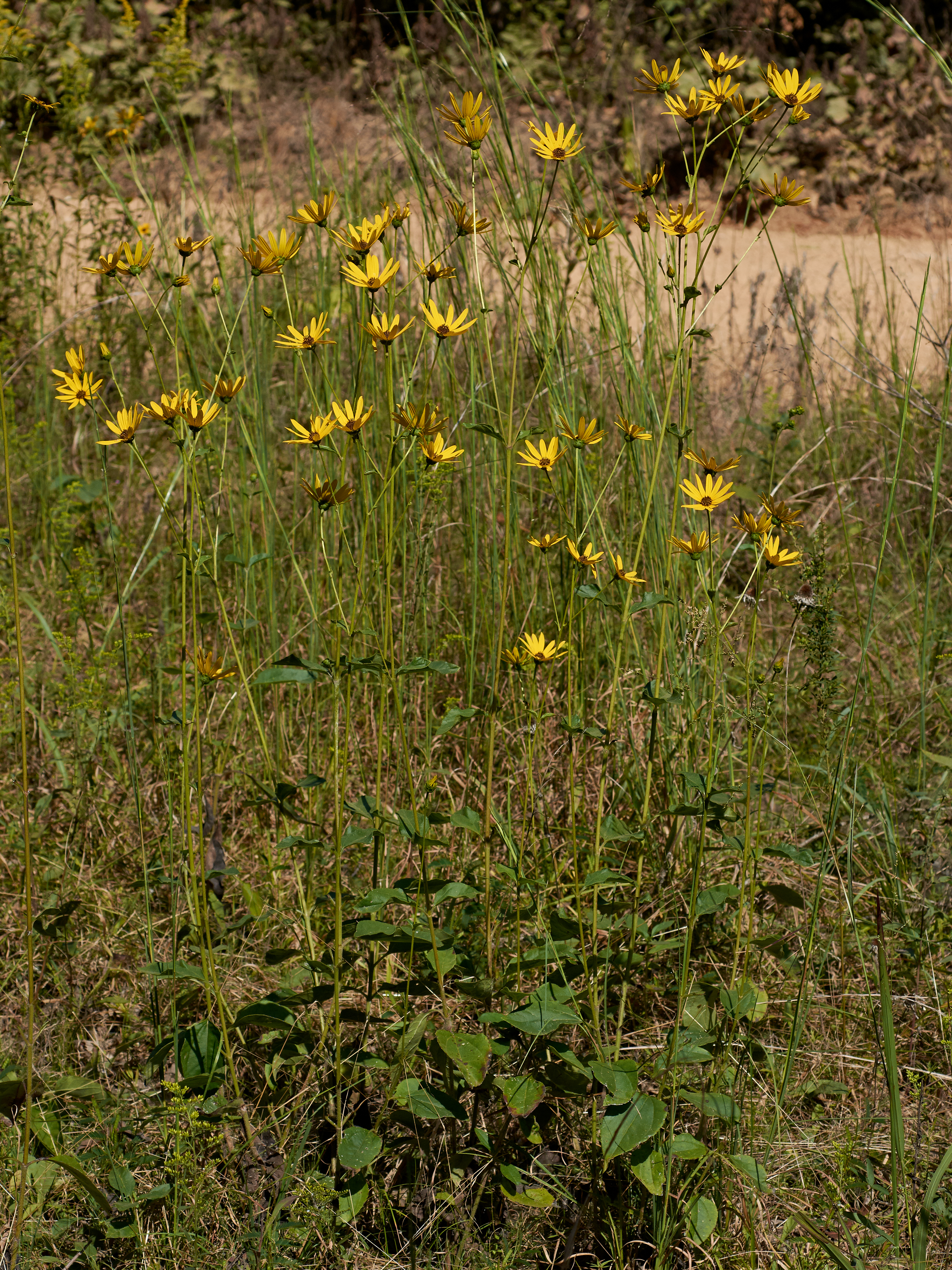

Conservation status
- Least Concern (IUCN 3.1)

Scientific classification
- Kingdom: Plantae
- Clade: Tracheophytes
- Clade: Angiosperms
- Clade: Eudicots
- Clade: Asterids
- Order: Asterales
- Family: Asteraceae
- Tribe: Heliantheae
- Genus: Helianthus
- Species: H. silphioides

Binomial name
- Helianthus silphioides Nutt. 1841

Synonyms
- Helianthus atrorubens var. pubescens Kuntze; Helianthus kentuckiensis McFarland & W.A.Anderson

= Helianthus silphioides =

Species of sunflower

Helianthus silphioides is a North American species of sunflower known by the common names rosinweed sunflower or Ozark sunflower. It is native to the central United States, primarily in the Ozarks and the Tennessee Valley with additional populations north into Kentucky and Illinois and south as far as Louisiana, Mississippi and Alabama.

Helianthus silphioides grows in open locations. It is a perennial herb up to 300 cm (10 feet) tall. Leaves are broadly egg-shaped. One plant usually produces 3-15 flower heads, each containing 8–13 yellow ray florets surrounding 75 or more red disc florets.

A 2004 Illinois conservation assessment listed Helianthus silphioides as critically imperiled within the state. The species is also considered endangered within Kentucky, likely due to habitat loss of open oak woodlands and barrens. Throughout the remained of its range, it is considered apparently secure or conservation status is unknown.
