= Helianthus ambiguus =

Scientific classification
- Kingdom: Plantae
- Clade: Tracheophytes
- Clade: Angiosperms
- Clade: Eudicots
- Clade: Asterids
- Order: Asterales
- Family: Asteraceae
- Genus: Helianthus
- Species: H. ambiguus

Binomial name
- Helianthus ambiguus (Torr. & A.Gray) Britton

Synonyms
- Helianthus giganteus var. ambiguus Torr. & A.Gray

Species of sunflower

Helianthus ambiguus is a North American species of sunflower known by the common name ambiguous sunflower. It is found only in the Great Lakes region of the United States, the states of New York, Michigan, Ohio, and Wisconsin.

== Description ==
Helianthus ambiguus is an herb up to 80 cm (31.5 in) tall. Leaves are long and narrow, lance-shaped, up to 15 cm (6 in) long. One plant produces a few flower heads, each 7–8 cm (3–3 in) across.
