= Helianthus dissectifolius =

Scientific classification
- Kingdom: Plantae
- Clade: Tracheophytes
- Clade: Angiosperms
- Clade: Eudicots
- Clade: Asterids
- Order: Asterales
- Family: Asteraceae
- Genus: Helianthus
- Species: H. dissectifolius

Binomial name
- Helianthus dissectifolius Small

Species of sunflower

Helianthus dissectifolius is a rare species of sunflower, endemic to Mexico. It is found only in the states of Chihuahua and Durango in north-central Mexico.
