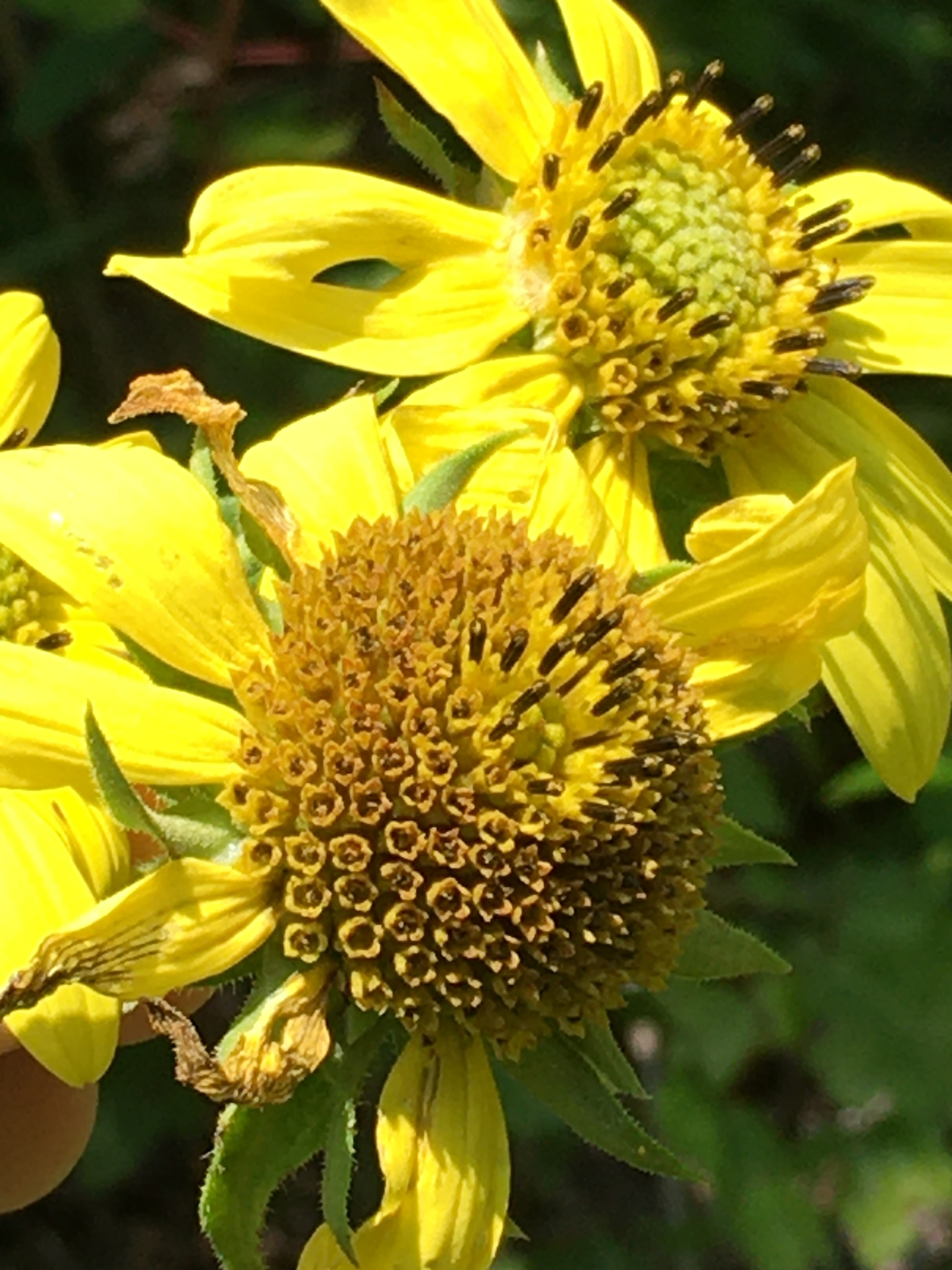

Conservation status
- Least Concern (IUCN 3.1)

Scientific classification
- Kingdom: Plantae
- Clade: Tracheophytes
- Clade: Angiosperms
- Clade: Eudicots
- Clade: Asterids
- Order: Asterales
- Family: Asteraceae
- Tribe: Heliantheae
- Genus: Helianthus
- Species: H. resinosus

Binomial name
- Helianthus resinosus Small

= Helianthus resinosus =

Species of sunflower

Helianthus resinosus is a North American species of sunflower known by the common name resindot sunflower. It is native to the southeastern United States from Mississippi to North Carolina.

Helianthus resinosus grows in open swamps and meadows, and along roadsides. It is a perennial herb up to 300 cm (10 feet) tall, spreading by means of underground rhizomes. Leaves are up to 20 cm (8 inches) long, dotted with visible resin glands embedded in the leaves. One plant usually produces 1-5 flower heads, each containing 10-20 yellow ray florets surrounding 90 or more yellow disc florets.
