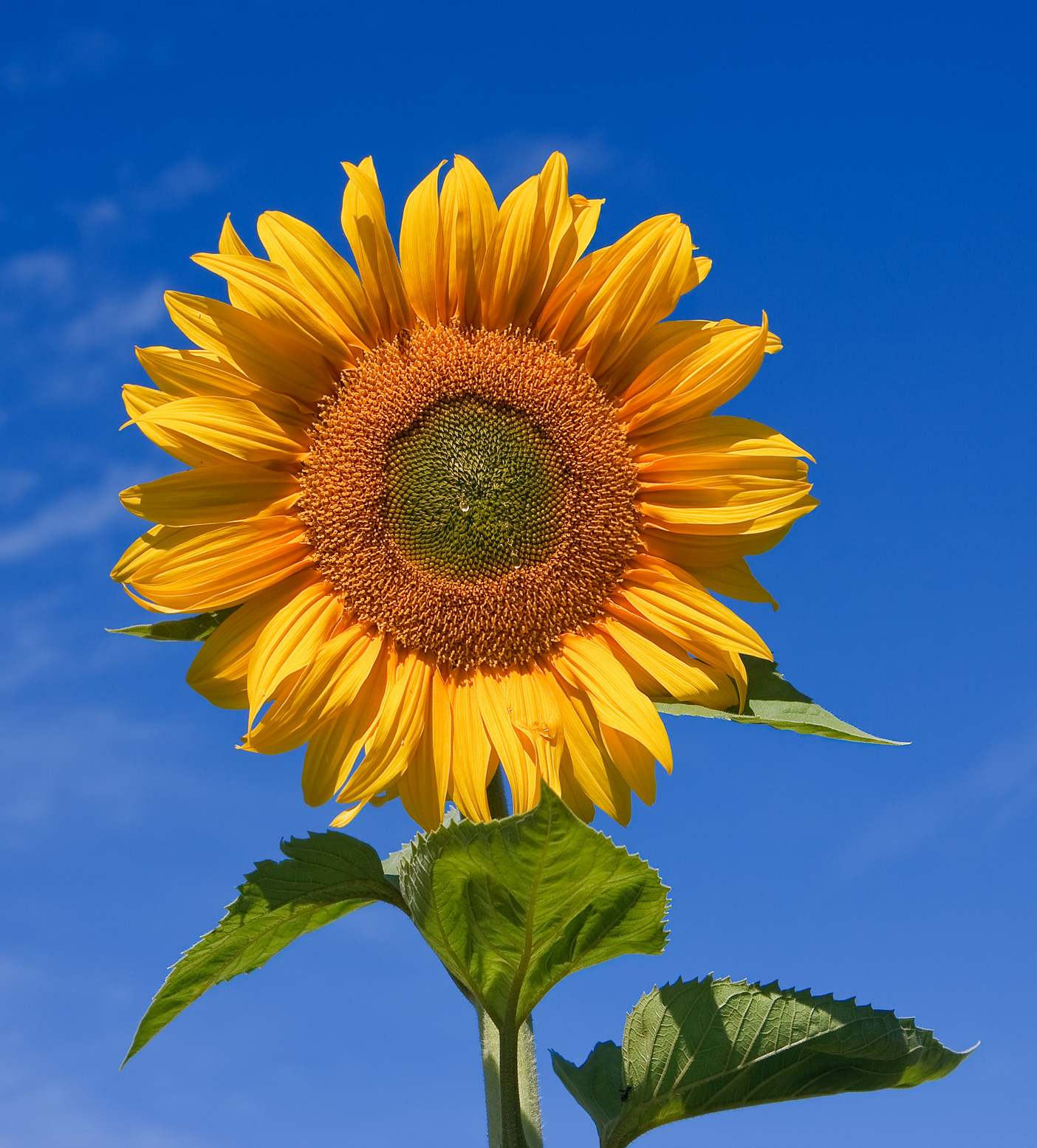
- Common sunflower (Helianthus annuus)

Scientific classification
- Kingdom: Plantae
- Clade: Tracheophytes
- Clade: Angiosperms
- Clade: Eudicots
- Clade: Asterids
- Order: Asterales
- Family: Asteraceae
- Subfamily: Asteroideae
- Tribe: Heliantheae
- Subtribe: Helianthinae
- Genus: Helianthus; L.

Synonyms
- Harpalium (Cass.) Cass.

= Helianthus =

Genus of flowering plants, the sunflowers

Helianthus (/ˌhiːliˈænθəs/) is a genus comprising around 50 species of annual and perennial flowering plants in the daisy family Asteraceae commonly known as sunflowers. The species of Helianthus are native to North America. The best-known species is the common sunflower (Helianthus annuus). This and other species, notably Jerusalem artichoke (H. tuberosus), are cultivated in temperate regions and some tropical regions, as food crops for humans, cattle, and poultry, and as ornamental plants. The species H. annuus typically grows during the summer and into early fall, with the peak growth season being mid-summer.

Several perennial Helianthus species are grown in gardens, but have a tendency to spread rapidly and can become aggressive. On the other hand, the whorled sunflower, Helianthus verticillatus, was listed as an endangered species in 2014 when the U.S. Fish and Wildlife Service issued a final rule protecting it under the Endangered Species Act. The primary threats to this species are industrial forestry and pine plantations in Alabama, Georgia, and Tennessee. They grow to 1.8 metres (6 feet) and are primarily found in woodlands, adjacent to creeks and moist, prairie-like areas.

The common sunflower is the national flower of Ukraine, cultivated there for several centuries. The wild sunflower is the state flower of Kansas, referred to as the Sunflower State, meant to symbolize the state's hardiness and endurance.

== Description ==
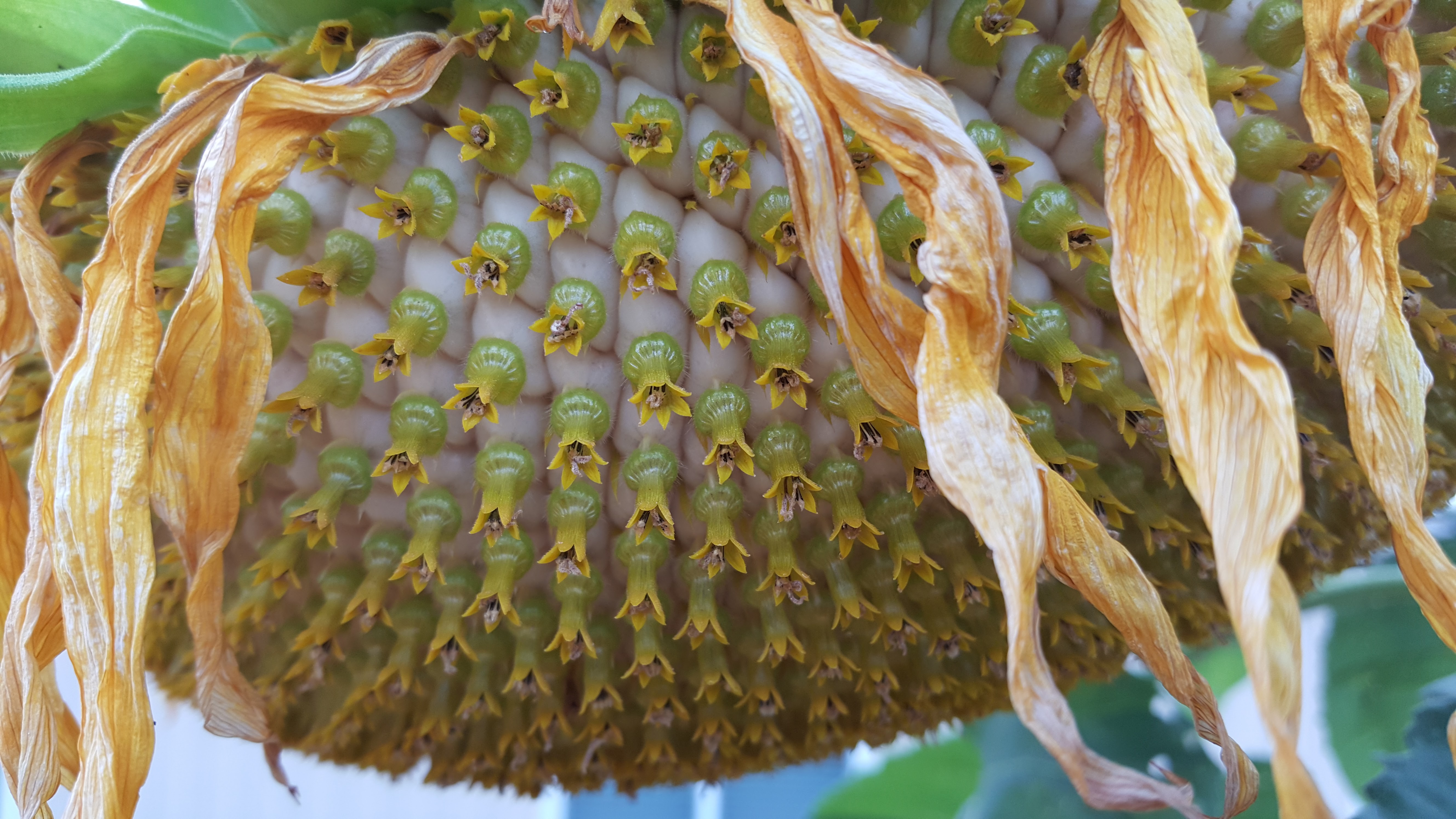
The disk of a sunflower is made up of many little flowers. The ray flowers here are dried

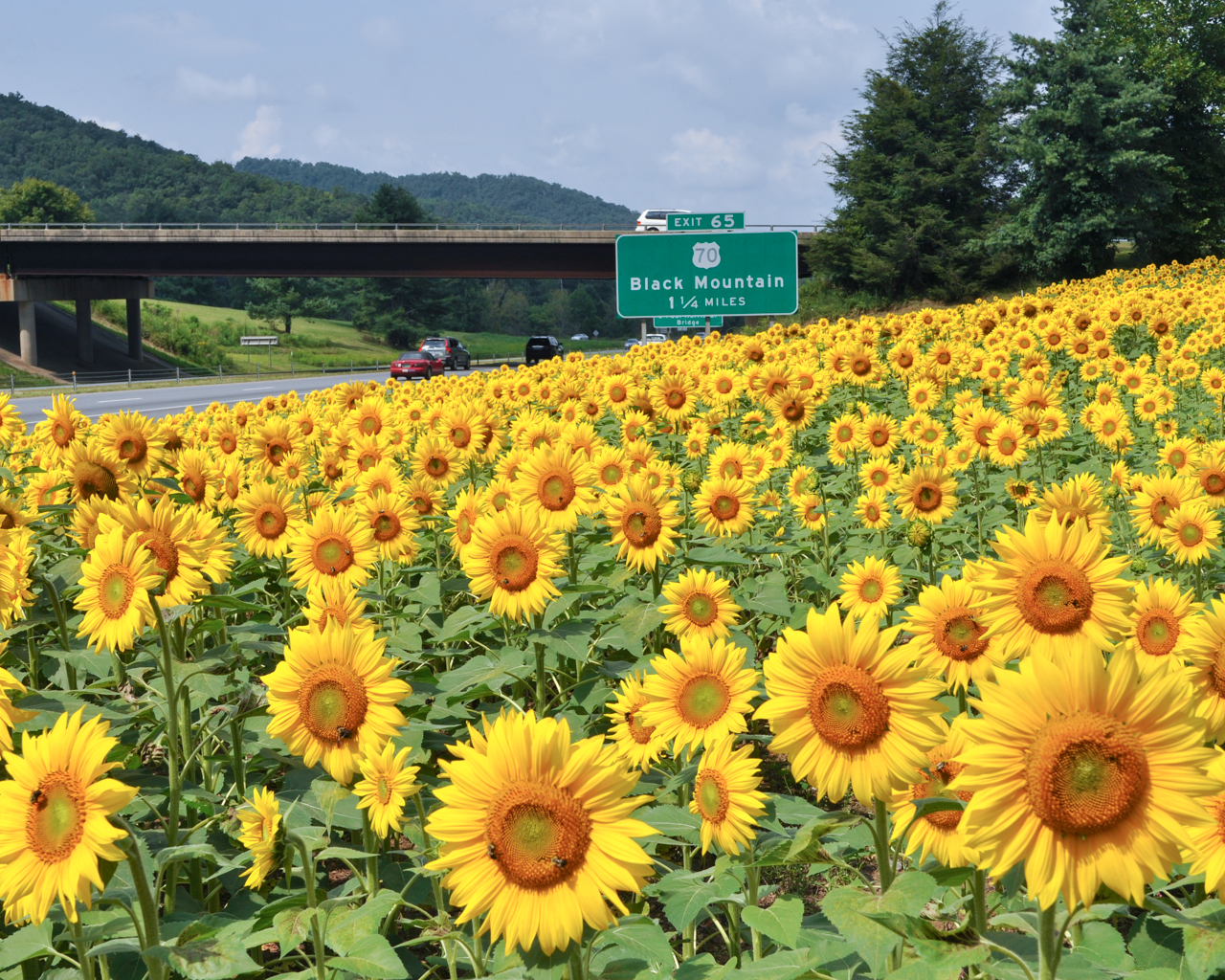
In North Carolina

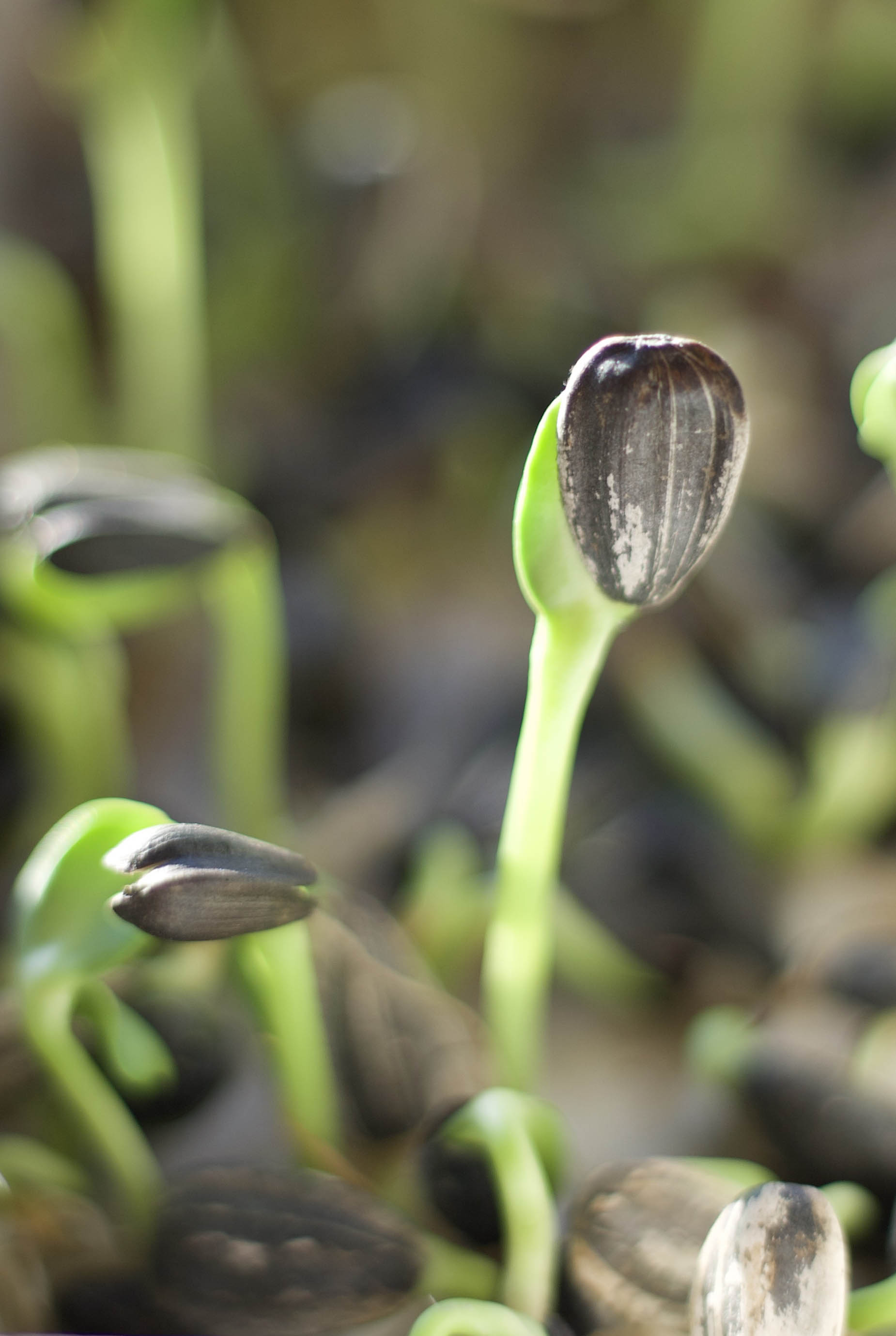
A sunflower seed growing

Sunflowers are usually tall annual or perennial plants that in some species can grow to a height of 300 centimetres (120 inches) or more. Each "flower" is actually a disc made up of tiny flowers, to form a larger false flower to better attract pollinators. The plants bear one or more wide, terminal capitula (flower heads made up of many tiny flowers), with bright yellow ray florets (mini flowers inside a flower head) at the outside and yellow or maroon (also known as a brown/red) disc florets inside. Several ornamental cultivars of H. annuus have red-colored ray florets; all of them stem from a single original mutant. While the majority of sunflowers are yellow, there are branching varieties in other colors including, orange, red and purple.

The petiolate leaves are dentate and often sticky. The lower leaves are opposite, ovate, or often heart-shaped. The rough and hairy stem is branched in the upper part in wild plants, but is usually unbranched in domesticated cultivars.

This genus is distinguished technically by the fact that the ray florets (when present) are sterile, and by the presence on the disk flowers of a pappus that is of two awn-like scales that are caducous (that is, easily detached and falling at maturity). Some species also have additional shorter scales in the pappus, and one species lacks a pappus entirely. Another technical feature that distinguishes the genus more reliably, but requires a microscope to see, is the presence of a prominent, multicellular appendage at the apex of the style. Further, the florets of a sunflower are arranged in a natural spiral.

Variability is seen among the perennial species that make up the bulk of those in the genus. Some have most or all of the large leaves in a rosette at the base of the plant and produce a flowering stem that has leaves that are reduced in size. Most of the perennials have disk flowers that are entirely yellow, but a few have disk flowers with reddish lobes. One species, H. radula, lacks ray flowers altogether.

Overall, the macroevolution of the Helianthus is driven by multiple biotic and abiotic factors and influences various floral morphology.

Helianthus species are used as food plants by the larvae of many lepidopterans.

=== Growth stages ===
The growth of a sunflower depends strictly on its genetic makeup and background. Additionally, the season it is planted will have effects on its development; those seasons tend to be in the middle of summer and beginning of fall. Sunflower development is classified by a series of vegetative stages and reproductive stages that can be determined by identifying the heads or main branch of a single head or branched head.

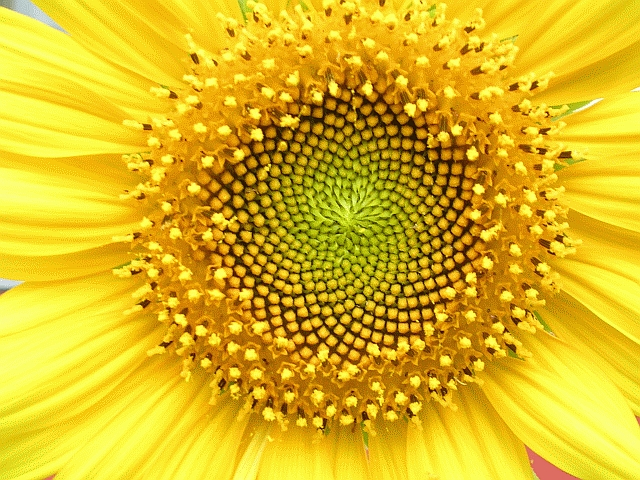
Sunflower florets are arranged in a natural spiral having a Fibonacci sequence

=== Facing the Sun (heliotropism) ===
Before blooming, Helianthus plant heads tilt upwards during the day to face the Sun. This movement is referred to as heliotropism, which continues for a short time when flower buds form and young Helianthus heads track the Sun. At night, the flower heads reorient their position and face east in anticipation of the sunrise. Sunflowers move back to their original position between the hours of 3am and 6am, and the leaves follow about an hour later.

By the time they are mature and reach anthesis, Helianthus generally stop moving and remain facing east, which lets them be warmed by the rising sun. Historically, this has led to controversy on whether or not Helianthus is heliotropic, as many scientists have failed to observe movement when studying plants that have already bloomed.

This is notably different from heliotropism in leaves, as the moving mechanism for leaves exists in the pulvinus. Since flowers do not have pulvini, the movement is caused by increased growth rate of the stems. The growth rate accumulation of the stem on the east side of the stem gradually pushes the flower from east to west during daytime. This matches with the Sun as it rises from the east and falls in the west. At night, the growth rate is higher in the west side of the stem that gradually pushes the flower from the west side back to the east side. In addition, it is not actually the whole plant that changes its direction to face the Sun, but the flower itself that bends to be illuminated by the Sun's rays.

The heliotropic movement is caused by growth on the opposite side of the flower, driven by accumulation of growth hormones during Sun exposure.

Heliotropism persists on cloudy days when the sun is not shining brightly, meaning that the movement is endogenous as a trained and continuous process. However, flower movement does not occur during long periods of rain or clouds. It also does not occur in a growth chamber when exposed to 16 hours of light or in greenhouses, suggesting that the plants require a directional, moving light source. Helianthus can also discriminate between different types of light. When exposed to different light frequencies, the hypocotyls will bend toward blue light but not red light, depending on the quality of the light source.

It is the circadian rhythms and the differences of the stem growth rate that work together and cause the heliotropism of the Helianthus. This is important for attracting pollinators and increasing growth metabolism. Future studies are required to identify the exact physiological basis and cellular mechanism for this behavior.

== Taxonomy ==
Helianthus is derived from Greek ἥλιος hēlios "sun" and ἄνθος ánthos "flower", because its round flower heads in combination with the ligules look like the Sun.

There are many species recognized in the genus:

- Helianthus agrestis Pollard – southeastern sunflower – Florida, Georgia
- Helianthus ambiguus Britt. – Wisconsin, Michigan, Ohio, New York
- Helianthus angustifolius L. – swamp sunflower – Texas, northern Florida to southern Illinois, Long Island, New York
- Helianthus annuus L. – common sunflower, girasol – most of United States + Canada
- Helianthus anomalus S.F.Blake – western sunflower – Nevada, Utah, Arizona, New Mexico
- Helianthus argophyllus Torr. & A.Gray – silverleaf sunflower – Texas, North Carolina, Florida
- Helianthus arizonensis R.C.Jacks. – Arizona sunflower – Arizona, New Mexico
- Helianthus atrorubens L. – purpledisk sunflower – Louisiana, Alabama, Georgia, Florida, South Carolina, North Carolina, Tennessee, Kentucky, Virginia
- Helianthus bolanderi A.Gray – serpentine sunflower – California, Oregon
- Helianthus × brevifolius E.Watson – Texas, Indiana, Ohio
- Helianthus californicus DC. – California sunflower – California
- Helianthus carnosus Small – lakeside sunflower – Florida
- Helianthus ciliaris DC. – Texas blueweed – United States: Washington, California, Arizona, New Mexico, Nevada, Utah, Texas, Oklahoma, Colorado, Kansas, Illinois; Mexico: Tamaulipas, Coahuila, Chihuahua, Sonora
- Helianthus cinereus Small – Missouri, Kentucky, Indiana, Ohio
- Helianthus coloradensis Cockerell – prairie sunflower – Colorado, New Mexico
- Helianthus cusickii A.Gray – Cusick's sunflower – Washington, Oregon, California, Idaho, Nevada
- Helianthus debilis Nutt. – cucumberleaf sunflower – Texas to Maine, Mississippi
- Helianthus decapetalus L. – thinleaf sunflower – eastern United States; Ontario, Quebec
- Helianthus deserticola Heiser – desert sunflower – Arizona, Nevada, Utah
- Helianthus devernii T.M.Draper – red rock sunflower – Nevada
- †Helianthus diffusus Sims – Missouri†
- Helianthus dissectifolius R.C.Jacks. – Chihuahua, Durango
- Helianthus divaricatus L. – woodland sunflower or rough woodland sunflower – eastern United States; Ontario, Quebec
- Helianthus × divariserratus R.W.Long Michigan, Indiana, Ohio, Connecticut
- Helianthus × doronicoides Lam. – Texas, Oklahoma, Arkansas, Missouri, Iowa, Minnesota, Illinois, Kentucky, Indiana, Ohio, Pennsylvania, Michigan, New Jersey, Virginia
- Helianthus eggertii Small – Alabama, Kentucky, and Tennessee
- Helianthus exilis A.Gray – California
- Helianthus floridanus A.Gray ex Chapm. – Florida sunflower – Louisiana, Alabama, Georgia, Florida, South Carolina, North Carolina
- Helianthus giganteus L. – giant sunflower – eastern United States; most of Canada
- Helianthus glaucophyllus D.M.Sm – whiteleaf sunflower – Tennessee, South Carolina, North Carolina
- Helianthus × glaucus Small – scattered locales in southeastern United States
- Helianthus gracilentus A.Gray – slender sunflower – California
- Helianthus grosseserratus M.Martens – sawtooth sunflower – Great Plains, Great Lakes, Ontario, Quebec
- Helianthus heterophyllus Nutt. – variableleaf sunflower – Coastal plain of Texas to North Carolina
- Helianthus hirsutus Raf. – hairy sunflower – central and eastern United States, Ontario
- Helianthus × intermedius R.W.Long – intermediate sunflower – scattered locales in United States
- Helianthus laciniatus A.Gray – alkali sunflower – United States: Arizona, New Mexico, Texas; Mexico: Coahuila, Nuevo León
- Helianthus × laetiflorus Pers. – cheerful sunflower, mountain sunflower – scattered in eastern and central United States; Canada
- Helianthus laevigatus Torr. & A.Gray – smooth sunflower – Georgia, South Carolina, North Carolina, Virginia, Maryland, West Virginia
- Helianthus lenticularis Douglas ex Lindl. Minnesota to North Dakota, Idaho, Missouri, Texas
- Helianthus longifolius Pursh – longleaf sunflower – Alabama, Georgia, North Carolina
- Helianthus × luxurians (E.Watson) E.Watson – Great Lakes region
- Helianthus maximiliani Schrad. – Maximillian sunflower – much of United States and Canada
- Helianthus membranifolius Poir. – Cayenne Island French Guiana
- Helianthus microcephalus Torr. & A.Gray – eastern United States
- Helianthus mollis Lam. – downy sunflower, ashy sunflower – Ontario, eastern and central United States
- Helianthus multiflorus L. – manyflower sunflower – Ohio
- Helianthus navarri Phil. – Chile
- Helianthus neglectus Heiser – neglected sunflower – New Mexico, Texas
- Helianthus niveus (Benth.) Brandegee – showy sunflower – United States: California, Arizona; Mexico: Baja California, Baja California Sur
- Helianthus nuttallii Torr. & A.Gray – western and central United States, Canada
- Helianthus occidentalis Riddell – fewleaf sunflower, western sunflower – Great Lakes region, scattered in southeastern United States
- Helianthus × orgyaloides Cockerell – Colorado, Kansas
- Helianthus paradoxus Heiser – paradox sunflower – Utah, New Mexico, Texas
- Helianthus pauciflorus Nutt. – stiff sunflower – central United States, Canada
- Helianthus petiolaris Nutt. – prairie sunflower, lesser sunflower – much of United States, Canada
- Helianthus porteri (A.Gray) Pruski – Porter's sunflower – Alabama, Georgia, South Carolina, North Carolina
- Helianthus praecox Engelm. & A.Gray Texas sunflower – Texas
- †Helianthus praetermissus – New Mexico sunflower – New Mexico†
- Helianthus pumilus Nutt. – little sunflower – Colorado, Wyoming, Montana, Utah, Idaho
- Helianthus radula (Pursh) Torr. & A.Gray – rayless sunflower – Louisiana, Mississippi, Alabama, Georgia, South Carolina, Florida
- Helianthus resinosus Small – resindot sunflower – Mississippi, Alabama, Georgia, South Carolina, North Carolina, Florida
- Helianthus salicifolius A.Dietr. – willowleaf sunflower – Texas, Oklahoma, Kansas, Missouri, Illinois, Wisconsin, Ohio, Pennsylvania, New York
- Helianthus sarmentosus Rich. – French Guiana
- Helianthus scaberrimus Elliott – South Carolina
- Helianthus schweinitzii Torr. & A.Gray – Schweinitz's sunflower – South Carolina, North Carolina
- Helianthus silphioides Nutt. – rosinweed sunflower – Lower Mississippi Valley
- Helianthus simulans E.Watson – muck sunflower – southeastern United States
- Helianthus smithii Heiser – Smith's sunflower – Alabama, Georgia, Tennessee
- Helianthus speciosus Hook. – Michoacán
- Helianthus strumosus L. – eastern and central United States, Canada
- Helianthus subcanescens (A.Gray) E.Watson – Manitoba, north-central United States
- Helianthus subtuberosus Bourg.
- Helianthus tuberosus L. – Jerusalem artichoke, sunchoke, earth-apple, topinambur – much of United States and Canada
- Helianthus verticillatus Small – whorled sunflower – Alabama, Georgia, Tennessee

=== Formerly included ===
The following species were previously included in the genus Helianthus.

- Flourensia thurifera (Molina) DC. (as H. thurifer Molina)
- Flourensia thurifera (Molina) DC. (as H. navarri) Phil.
- Helianthella quinquenervis (Hook.) A.Gray (as H. quinquenervis Hook.)
- Helianthella uniflora (Nutt.) Torr. & A.Gray (as H. uniflorus Nutt.)
- Pappobolus imbaburensis (Hieron.) Panero (as H. imbaburensis Hieron.)
- Viguiera procumbens (Pers.) S.F.Blake (as H. procumbens Pers.)

== Uses ==
The seeds of H. annuus are used for human consumption, for example, through sunflower oil, cakes, and meal. Most cultivars of sunflower are variants of H. annuus. However, H. tuberosus, the Jerusalem artichoke, which produces edible tubers is also domesticated.

There are many species in the sunflower genus Helianthus, and many species in other genera that may be called sunflowers.

- The Maximillian sunflower (Helianthus maximiliani) is one of 38 species of perennial sunflower native to North America. The Land Institute and other breeding programs are currently exploring the potential for these as a perennial seed crop.
- The sunchoke (Jerusalem artichoke or Helianthus tuberosus) is related to the sunflower, another example of perennial sunflower.
- The Mexican sunflower is Tithonia rotundifolia. It is only very distantly related to North American sunflowers.
- False sunflower refers to plants of the genus Heliopsis.

== Ecology ==
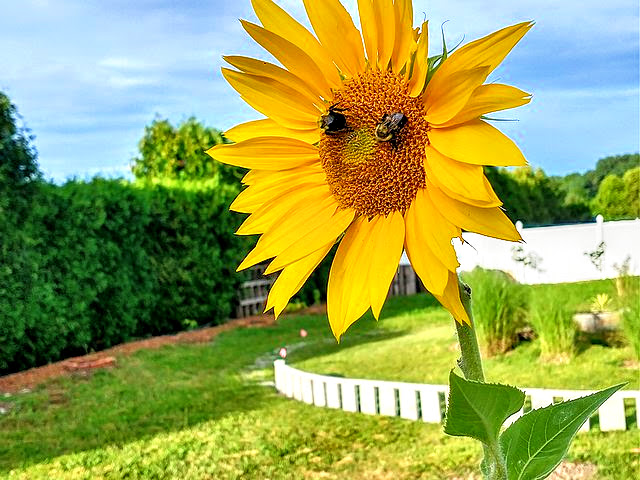
Bees pollinating a sunflower head

Sunflowers have been proven to be excellent plants to attract beneficial insects, including pollinators. Helianthus spp. are a nectar producing flowering plant that attract pollinators and parasitoids which reduce the pest populations in nearby crop vegetation. Sunflowers attract different beneficial pollinators (e.g., honey bees) and other known insect prey to feed on and control the population of parasitic pests that could be harmful to the crops. Predacious insects are first attracted to sunflowers once they are planted. Once the Helianthus spp. reaches six inches and produces flowers it begins to attract more pollinators. Distance between sunflower rows and crop vegetation plays an important role in this phenomenon, hypothesizing that closer proximity to the crops will increase insect attraction.

In addition to pollinators of Helianthus spp., there are other factors such as abiotic stress, florivory, and disease which also contribute to the evolution of floral traits. These selective pressures, which stem from several biotic and abiotic factors are associated with habitat environmental conditions which all play a role in the overall morphology of the sunflowers' floral traits.

An ecosystem is composed of both biotic (which are living elements of an ecosystem such as plants, animals, fungi, protists, and bacteria), and abiotic factors (non-living elements of an ecosystem such as air, soil, water, light, salinity and temperature).

It is thought that two biotic factors can explain for the evolution of larger sunflowers and why they are present in more drier environments. For one thing, the selection by pollinators is thought to have increased the sunflower's size in a drier environment. This is because in a drier environment, there are typically fewer pollinators. As a result, in order for the sunflower to be able to attract more pollinators, they had to increase the morphology of their floral traits in that they had to increase their display size. Another biotic factor that can explain for the evolution of larger sunflowers in drier environments is that the pressure from florivory and disease favors smaller flowers in habitats that have a more moderate supply of moisture (mesic habitat). Wetter environments usually have more dense vegetation, more herbivores, and more surrounding pathogens. As larger flowers are typically more susceptible to disease and florivory, smaller flowers may have evolved in wetter environments which explains the evolution of larger sunflowers in more drier environments.

== Gallery ==
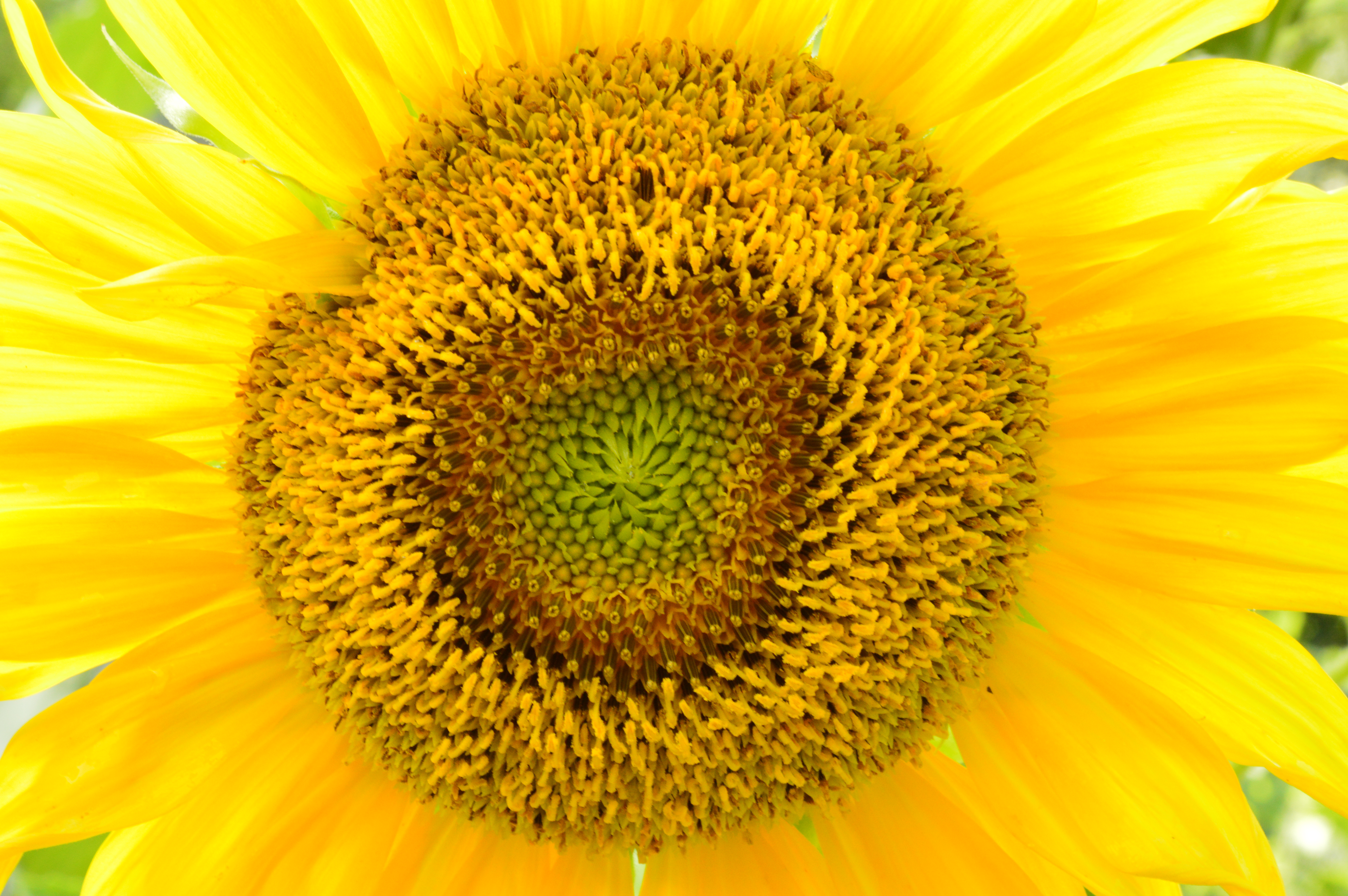
Close-up of a sunflower head

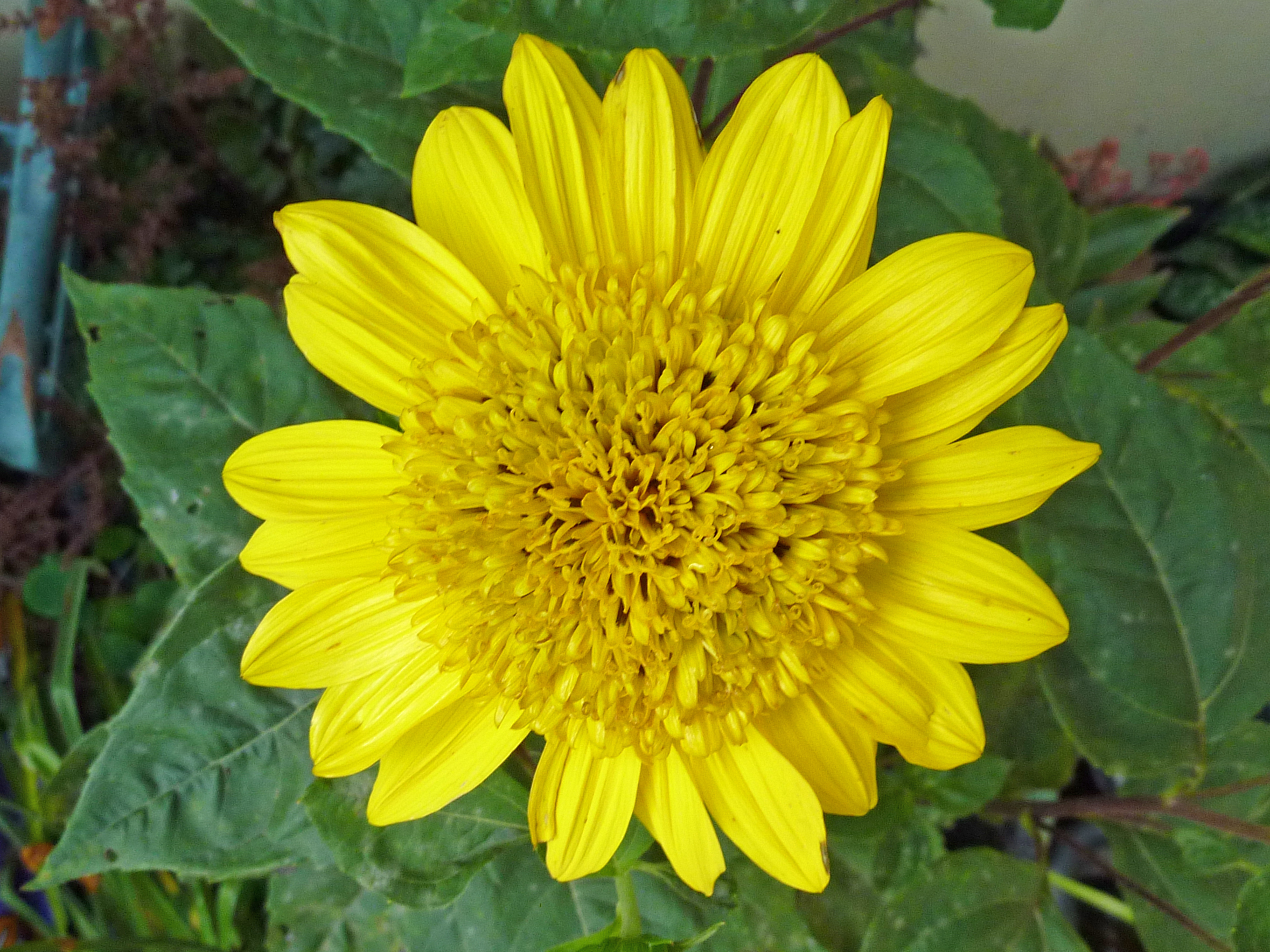
Helianthus decapetalus
"Plenus"

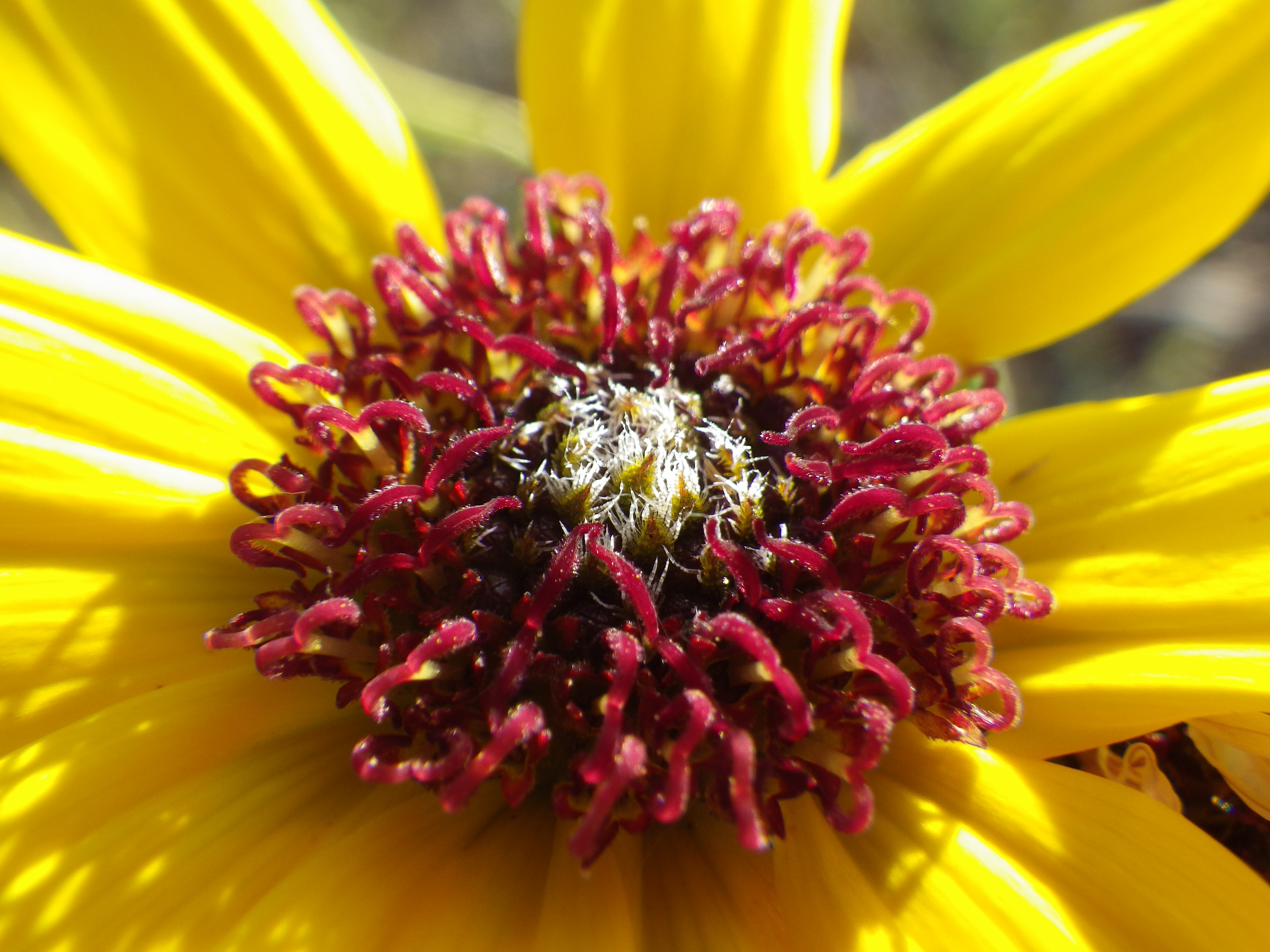
Prairie sunflower
(H. petiolaris)

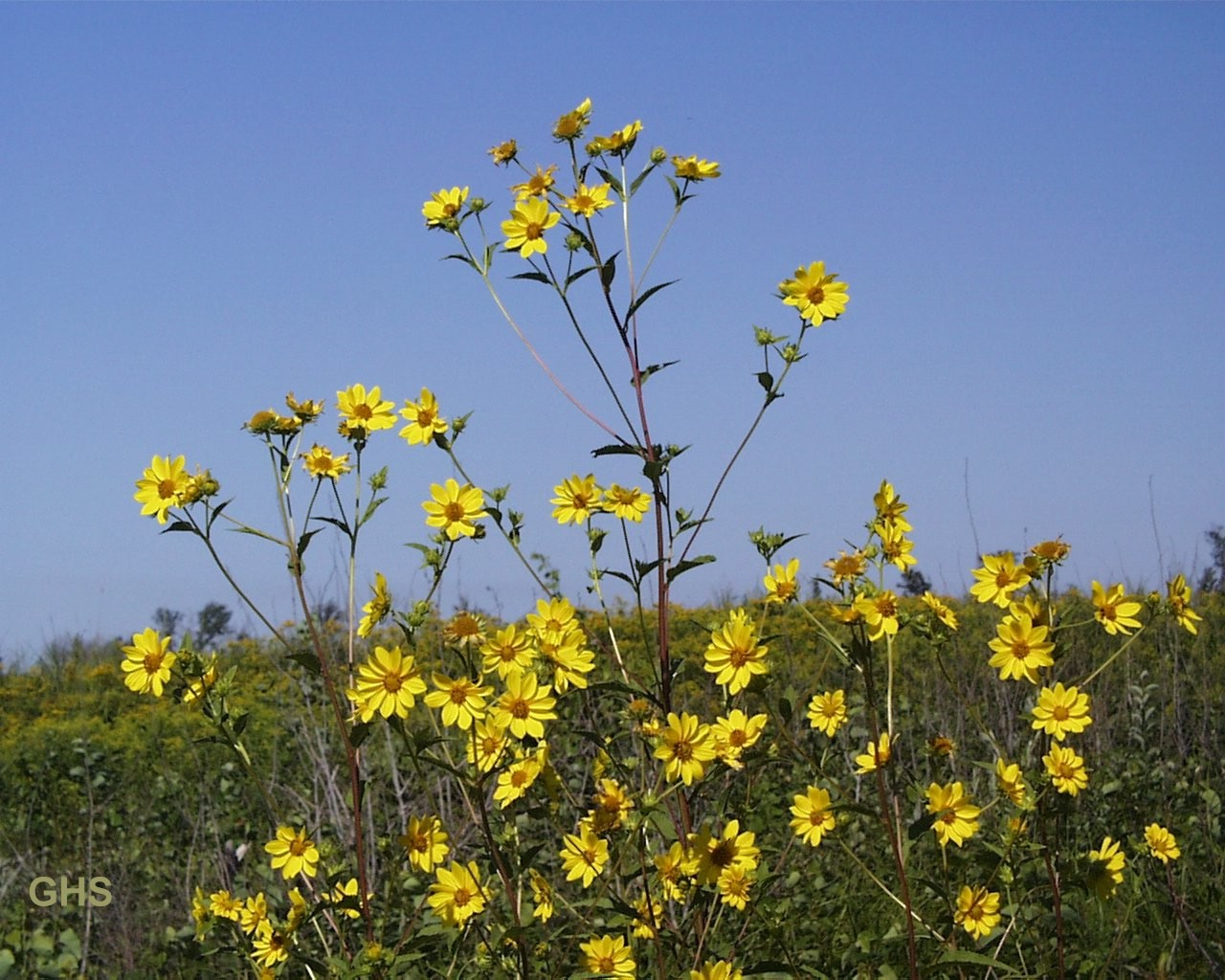
Giant sunflower
(H. giganteus)

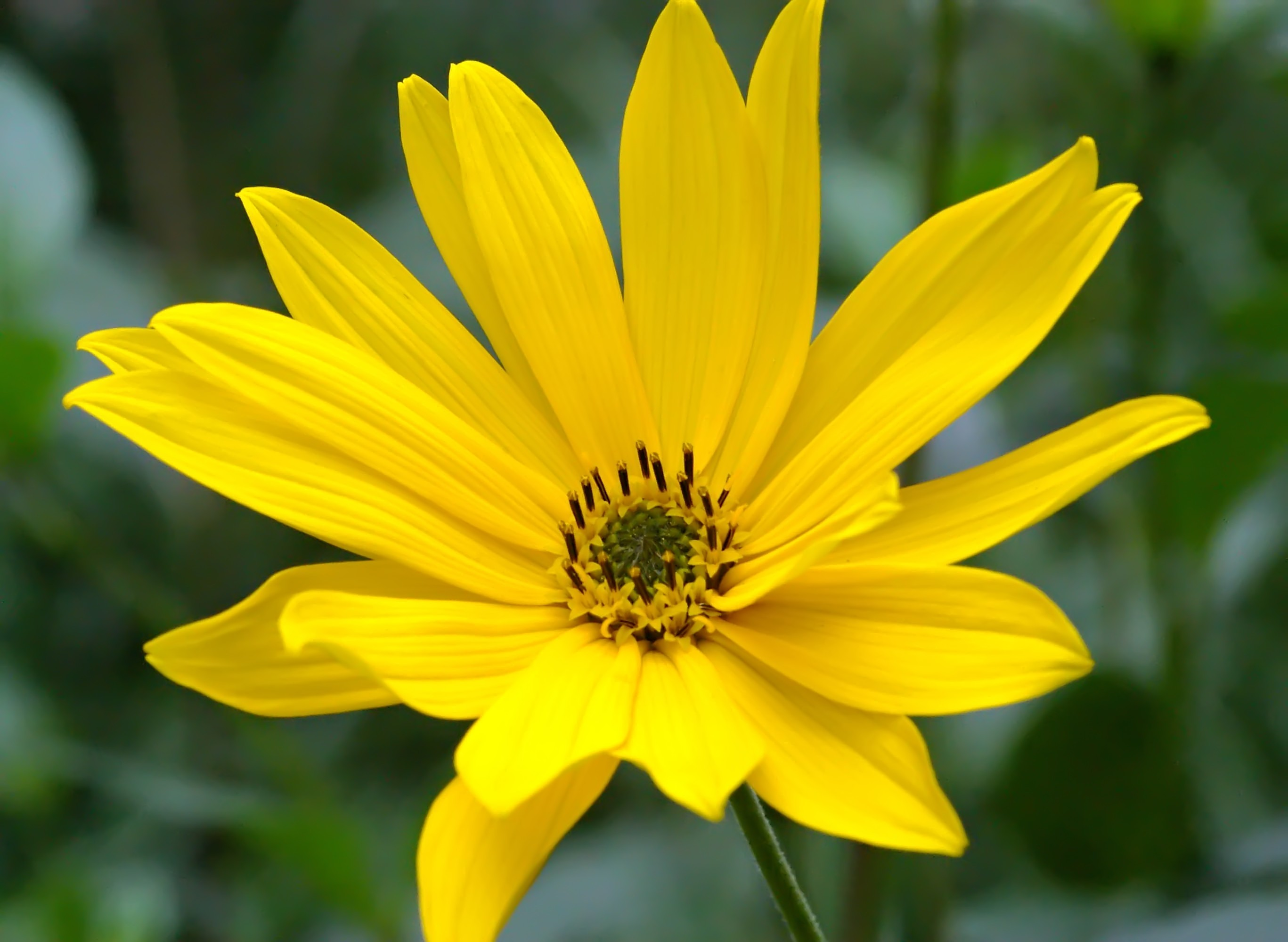
Jerusalem artichoke
(H. tuberosus)

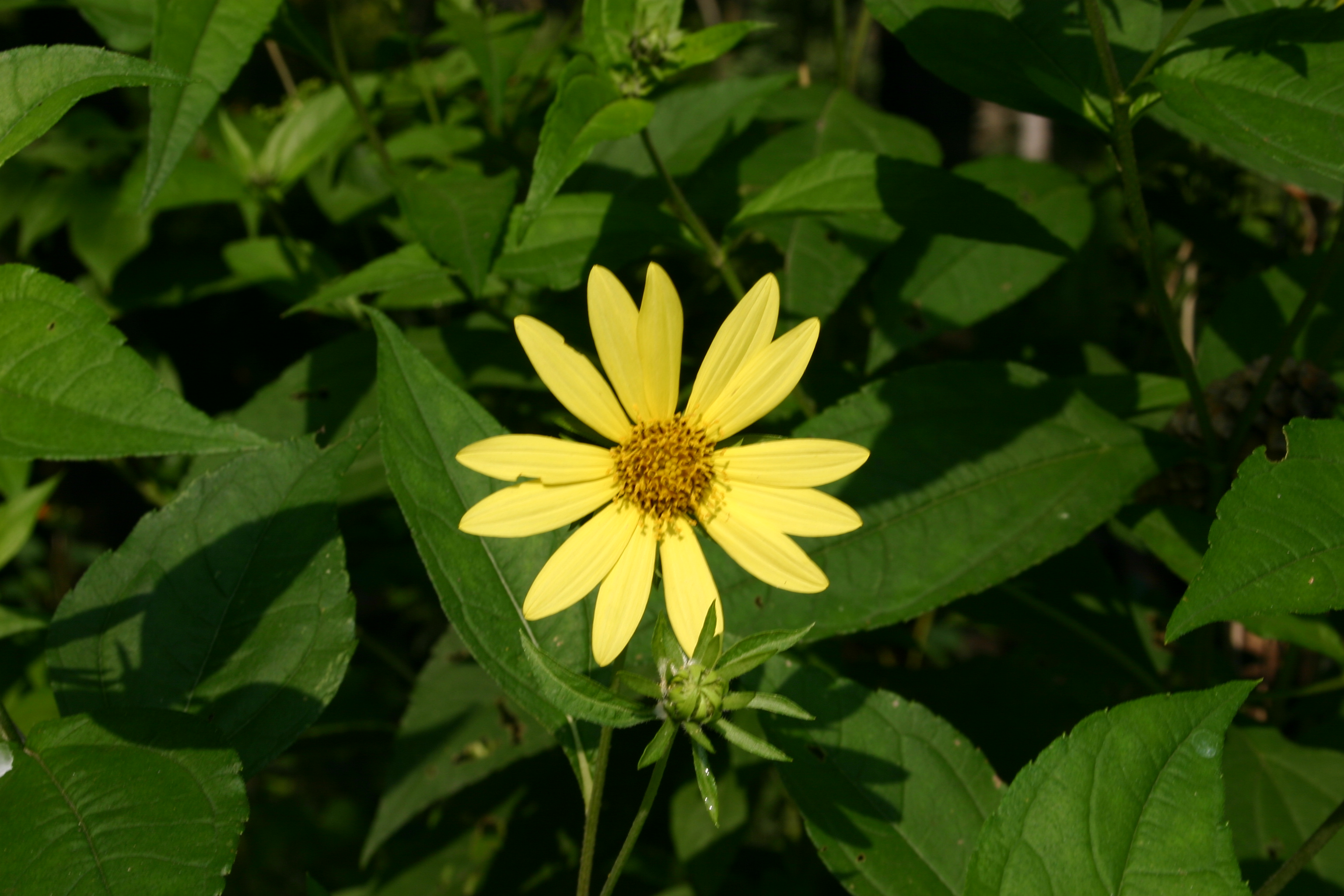
H. laetiflorus

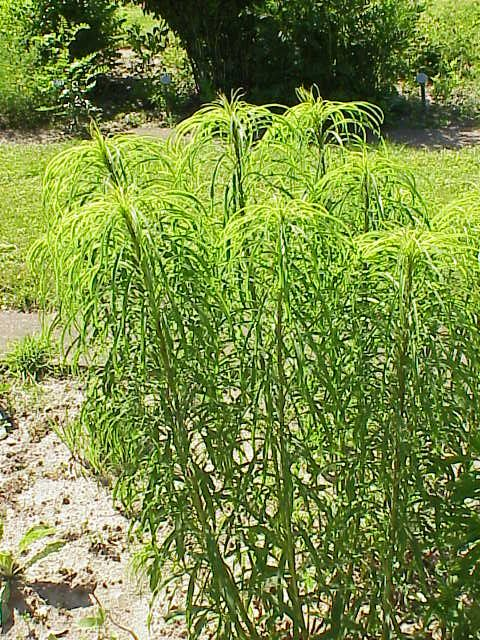
Willowleaf sunflower
(H. salicifolius)

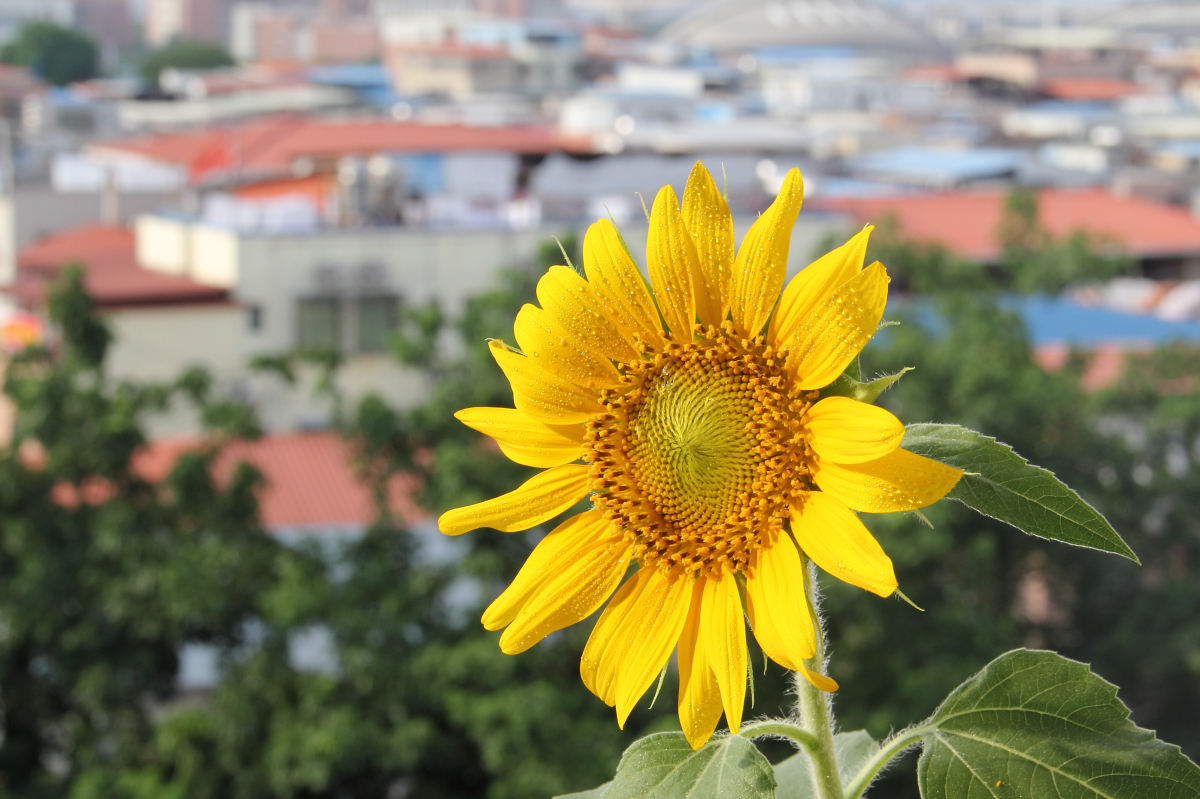
H. annuus

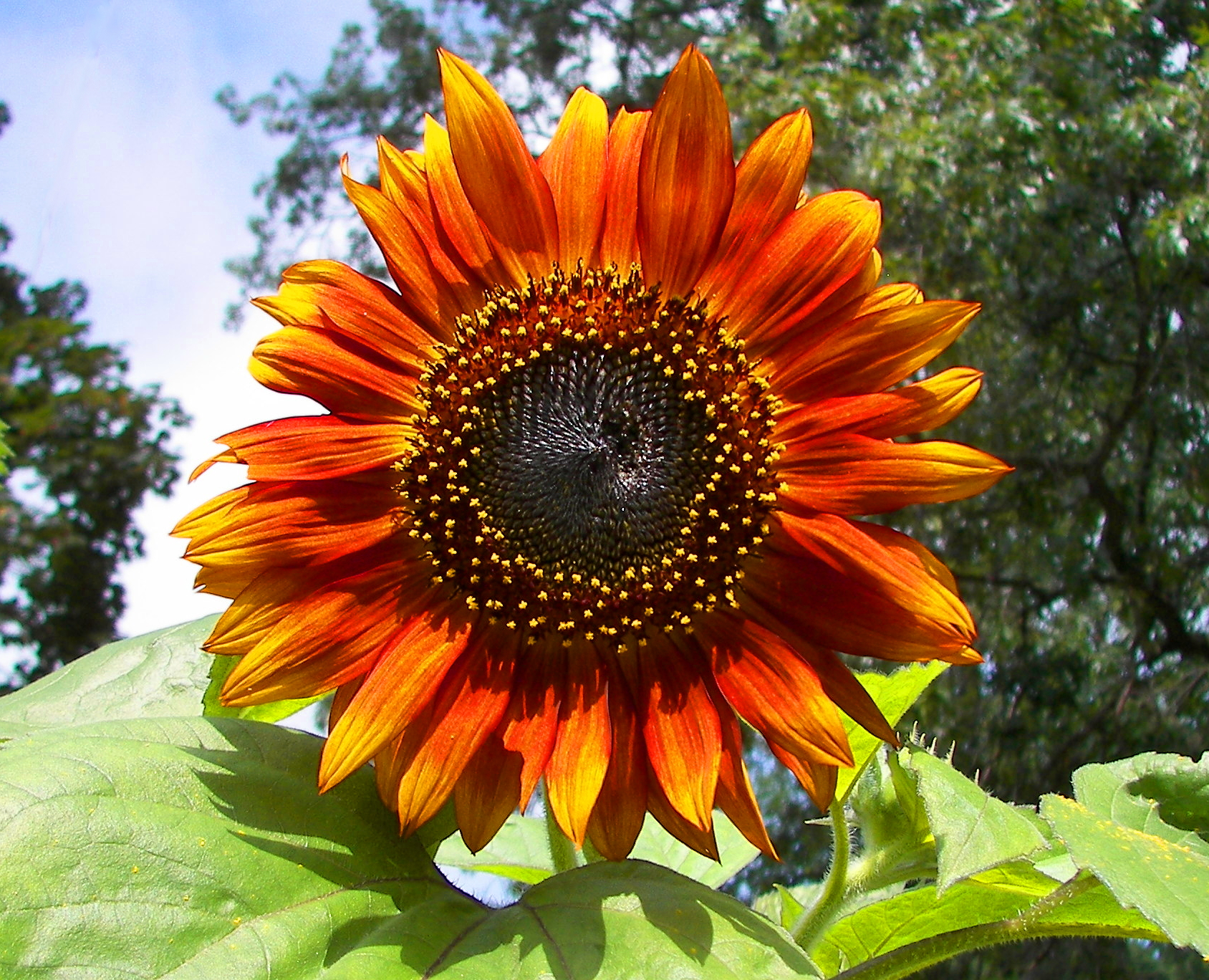
An orange-red sunflower

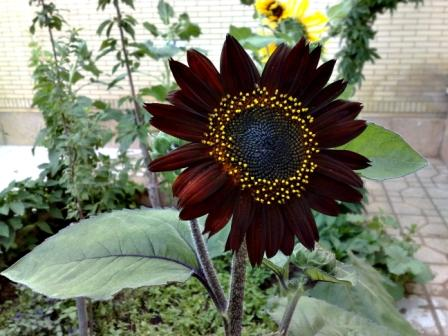
A dark red sunflower cultivar

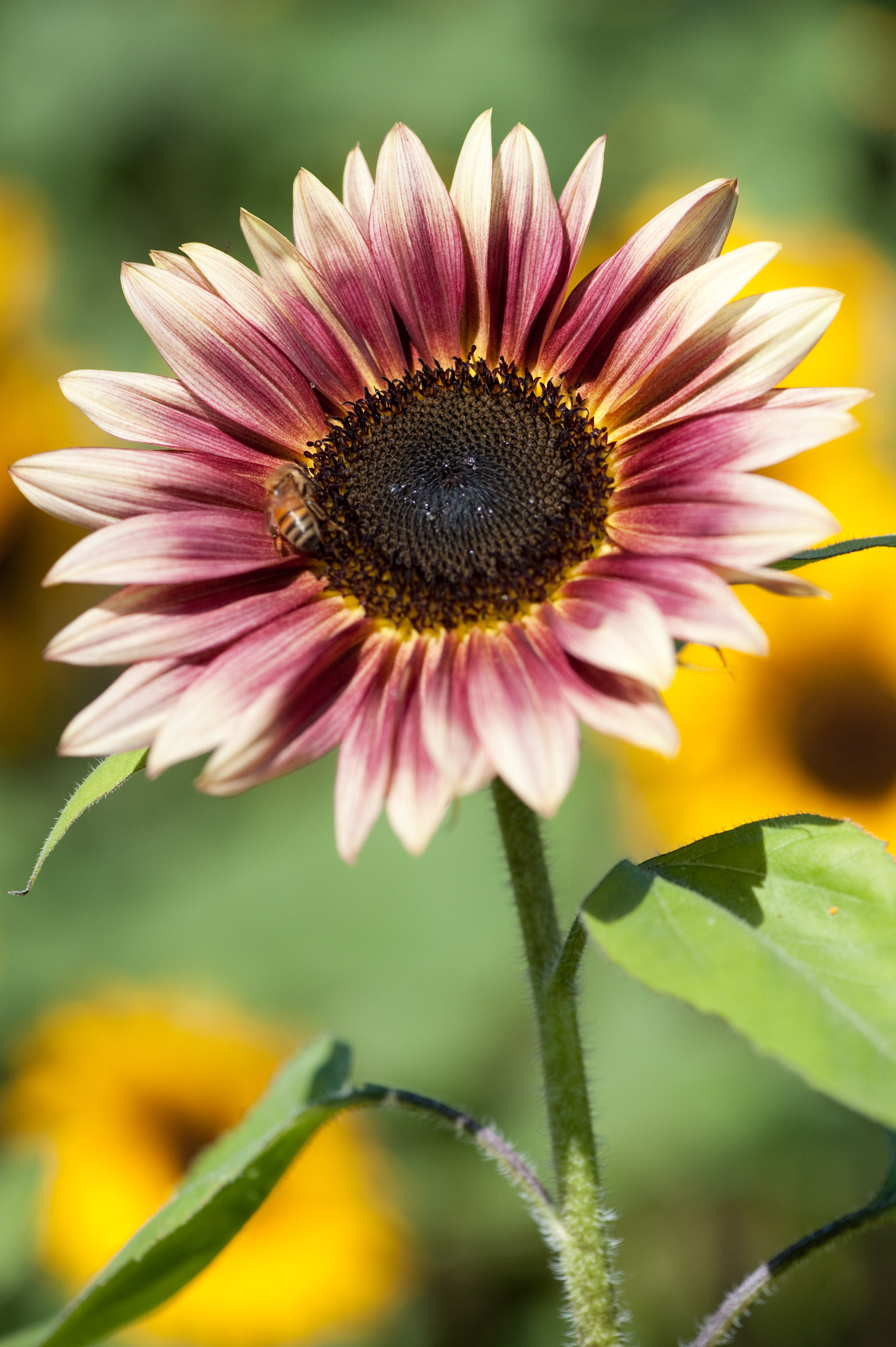
Helianthus
'Strawberry Blonde'

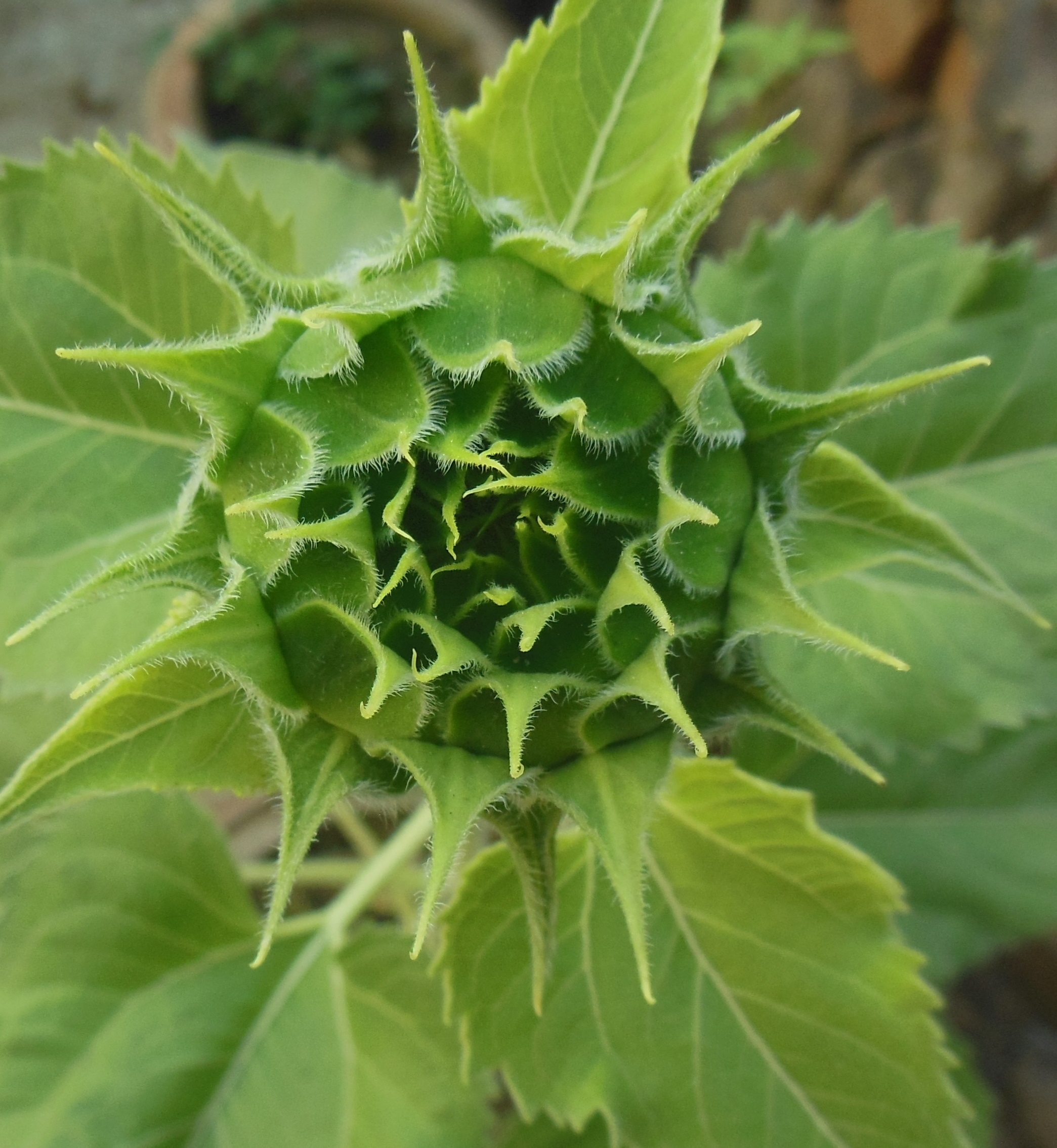
Sunflower bud

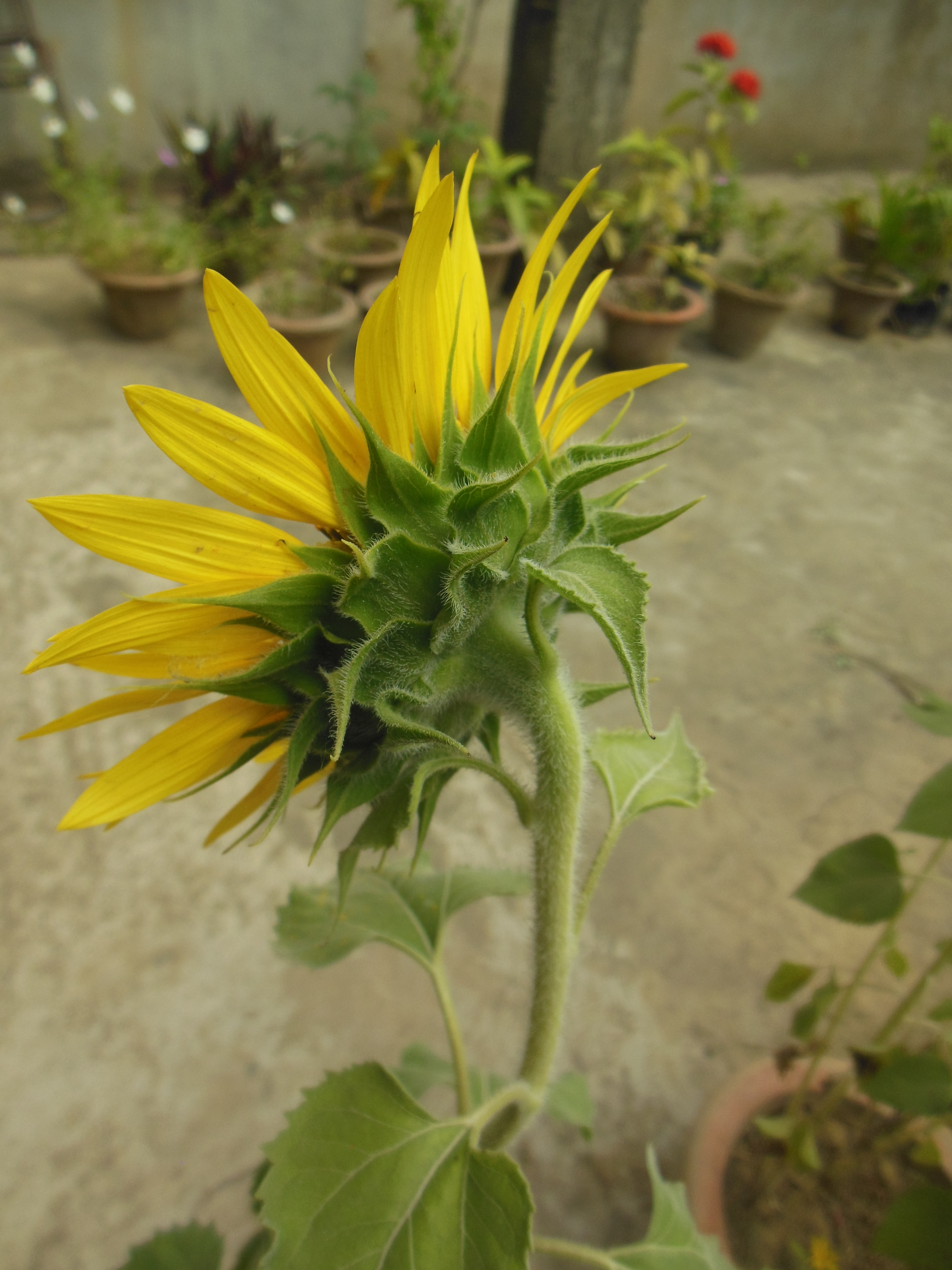
Rear view of a sunflower head

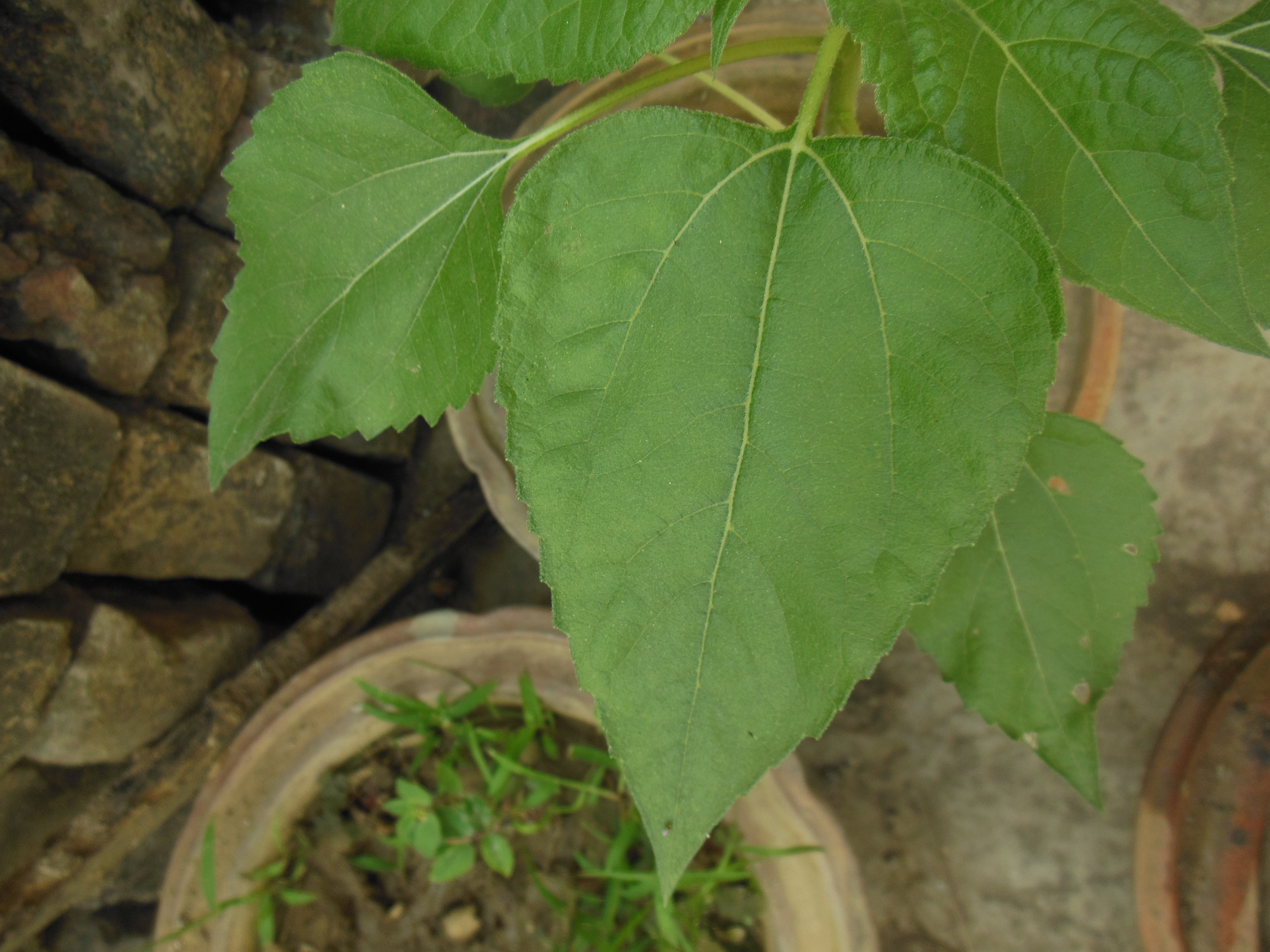
Leaves of a sunflower plant

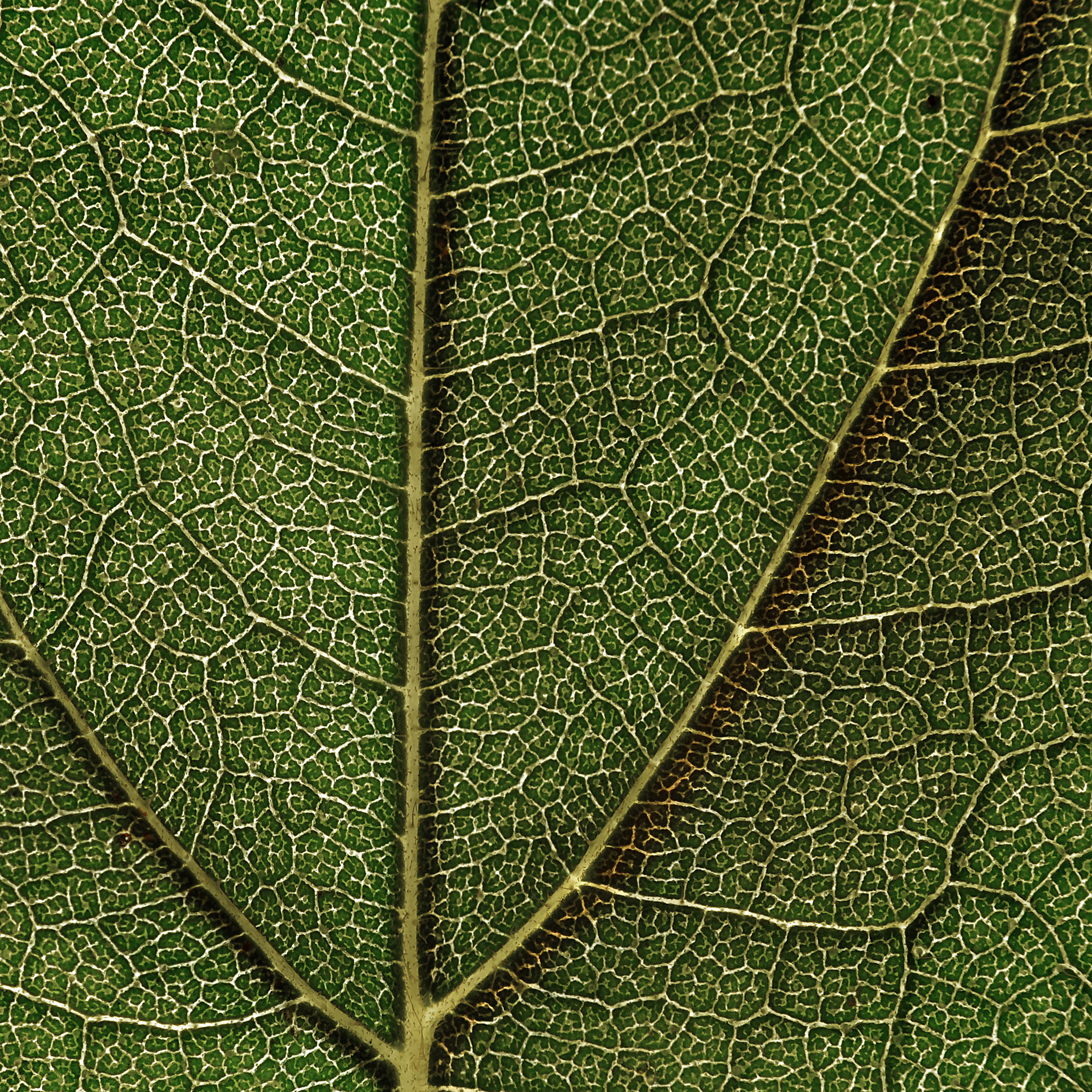
Sunflower leaf structure

Seed under a microscope

== See also ==
- Fermat's spiral
- Phyllotaxis
- Stegocintractia junci
