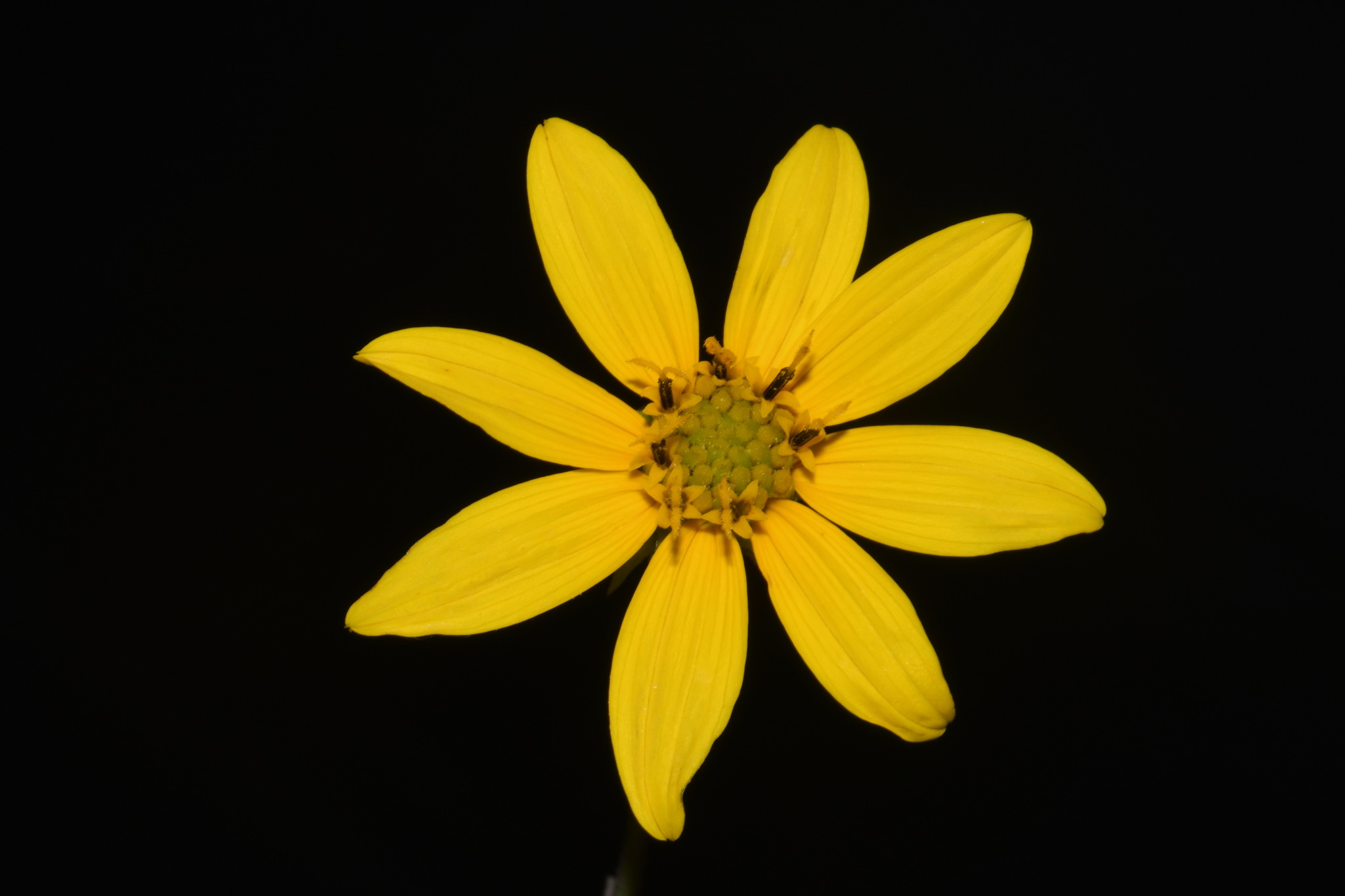
- Helianthus smithii

Scientific classification
- Kingdom: Plantae
- Clade: Tracheophytes
- Clade: Angiosperms
- Clade: Eudicots
- Clade: Asterids
- Order: Asterales
- Family: Asteraceae
- Tribe: Heliantheae
- Genus: Helianthus
- Species: H. smithii

Binomial name
- Helianthus smithii Heiser 1964

Synonyms
- Helianthus parviflorus var. attenuatus A.Gray 1884 not Helianthus attenuatus E.Watson 1929

= Helianthus smithii =

Species of sunflower

== Overview ==
Helianthus smithii, or Smith's sunflower, is a tall (70-170 cm) herbaceous species of sunflower found mostly in northeast Alabama and neighboring areas of Tennessee and Georgia, preferring dry, open wooded areas in moderate to high elevations. While it is most commonly found in North Alabama and nearby areas of Tennessee and Georgia, specimens have also been found in central Alabama by Auburn University collectors working in conjunction with the Auburn University Herbarium. The stems of Helianthus Smithii are usually purplish and upright and appear glaucous, but when dried or preserved they lose this unique color completely and become brown. The flowers also lose their color. Its leaves vary in color from light to dark green and are lance-linear to lanceolate with orange resin spots on the underside. This species has few small flower heads (1-5) and blooms in late summer to early fall. While it was initially disputed whether it was a hybrid of other small varieties of sunflower, it was named its own species in 1964 after two early collectors, John Donnell Smith and Dale M. Smith.

Among other varieties of wild sunflower, the genome of Helianthus smithii has been used for improving the genome of cultivated sunflowers so that better types of seed oil can be produced. To further this, the chemical composition of its seed oil has also been studied.

== Description ==
A preserved specimen of Helianthus smithii.

Helianthus smithii is a perennial herb that has a flowering life of over two years. Leaf dimensions range from 2.8-7 inches long and 0.4-0.7 inches wide, appearing longer and narrower. The sunflower's leaves have a rough and hairy texture with a pointed tip, toothed edges, and long vein running down the center. These leaves generally take on three types. Cauline leaves grow opposite in pairs with various shades of green. These appear more egg-shaped and narrow than phyllary and involucre leaves. Phyllary leaves are spear shaped and not gland-dotted, while involucre bracts are hemispheric in their shape. In general, H. smithii leaves usually grow in pairs on opposite sides of the stem, but they may grow alternately closer to the bud. H. smithii leaf stalks are usually about 0.4 inches in length.

The stem stands straight up, growing up to five feet tall and appearing purplish. The stem is typically branched off into 1-5 flower heads. In between the stem and the blossom is a hemispheric phyllary with on average 15 spear-shaped bracts which measure about 8x2.5mm each in length.

Smith's sunflower reproduces both sexually and asexually through rhizomes and crown buds. It is pollinated by bees and other insects and can produce fertile hybrids with other Helianthus. The sunflower is tetraploid, and flowers in the late summer to fall. It is typically found in patches of sun in dry woods as well as along streams and roadsides.

Helianthus smithii is ranked S1 by the Georgia Department of Natural Resources, meaning that it faces a very high risk of extinction. However, the species is ranked G3 globally. G3 describes a high possibility of becoming extinct due to limited communities and recent declines in population. Logging, herbicides, and invasive species contribute largely to this. Action plans for restoration include protecting and restoring the habitat (grasslands and prairies), determining how best to propagate and establish the species, identifying other populations, and reassessing the conservation status before further action.

== Taxonomy ==
Helianthus smithii was first scientifically documented and named Helianthus parviflorus var. attenuatus by botanist Asa Gray in 1929. This name was also assigned to another plant, leading to the eventual change to Helianthus smithii. The name Helianthus smithii, or “Smith's Sunflower,” was given to it by botanist Charles B. Heiser in 1964. Heiser chose the name to honor botanists John Donnell Smith and Dale Metz Smith. Then, in 2024, Weakley and Flora of the Southeastern US changed the name to Helianthus smithiorum, claiming that Heiser originally intended for the flower to commemorate two different Smiths.

The genus name Helianthus describes sunflowers. Parts of the word are derived from Greek origins, Helios, meaning sun, and antho, meaning flower-- a direct translation of the word sunflower. The species name, smithii, however, is a personal name and does not have any translations. The name Helianthus smithii translates loosely to "Smith's sunflower", the common name used today.

Its placement in the taxonomic tree is as follows: it is in the kingdom Plantae, the subkingdom Tracheobionta (vascular plants), the infrakingdom Streptophyta, the superdivision Spermatophyta (seed plants). It is under the division (or Phylum) Tracheophyta/Magnoliophyta (flowering plants), the subdivision Spermatophytina, the class Magnoliopsida (dicotyledons), the subclass Asteridae, the superorder Asteranae. In the order Asterales it is in the family Asteraceae (Aster family), the tribe Heliantheae, the genus Helianthus (sunflower), and its species is Helianthus smithii.

== Phylogenetics ==
Helianthus smithii is believed to actually be a stabilized hybrid between Helianthus microcephalus (Lemon Queen) and Helianthus strumosus (Woodland Sunflower), two related sunflower species. It has adapted to loss of land in the Great Plains and is now more commonly found in the southeastern United States. Unlike some other sunflower species, Helianthus smithii has no medicinal or traditional uses other than attracting pollinators and improving the genome of cultivated sunflowers.

== Distribution ==
Helianthus smithii is broadly found in the southeastern part of northern America. In October 2003, researchers went through five southeastern states (Tennessee, North Carolina, South Carolina, Georgia, and Alabama) in order to locate and document populations of Helianthus eggertii and H. verticillatus, a potentially endangered species. H. porteri, H. angustifolius, H. atrorubens, and H.smithii were also found on this expedition. Many species were distributed across multiple counties in multiple states, but Helianthus smithii was only found in the west-central part of North Carolina. The Smithii was least abundantly found on the trip-- only in one location-- compared to some of the other Helianthus species that were found in multiple locations and multiple states visited and present more abundantly where they were found. The Auburn University Museum of Natural History also has a specimen in its collection found in 1975, taken from Talladega County in central Alabama.
