= Helianthus arizonensis =

Conservation status
- Data Deficient (IUCN 3.1)

Scientific classification
- Kingdom: Plantae
- Clade: Tracheophytes
- Clade: Angiosperms
- Clade: Eudicots
- Clade: Asterids
- Order: Asterales
- Family: Asteraceae
- Tribe: Heliantheae
- Genus: Helianthus
- Species: H. arizonensis

Binomial name
- Helianthus arizonensis R.C.Jacks.

Species of sunflower

Helianthus arizonensis is a North American species of sunflower known by the common name Arizona sunflower. It is native to the states of Arizona and New Mexico in the southwestern United States.

Helianthus arizonensis is a perennial herb up to 30 cm (12 inches) tall. Its leaves have no hairs. One plant produces 1-7 flower heads, each head with 10-14 yellow ray florets surrounding at least 30 yellow disc florets.
