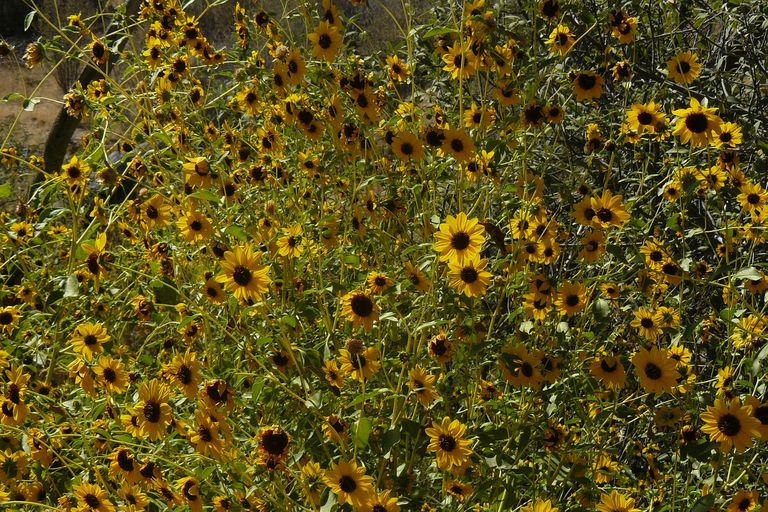

Conservation status
- Least Concern (IUCN 3.1)

Scientific classification
- Kingdom: Plantae
- Clade: Tracheophytes
- Clade: Angiosperms
- Clade: Eudicots
- Clade: Asterids
- Order: Asterales
- Family: Asteraceae
- Tribe: Heliantheae
- Genus: Helianthus
- Species: H. bolanderi

Binomial name
- Helianthus bolanderi A.Gray

= Helianthus bolanderi =

Species of sunflower

Helianthus bolanderi is a species of sunflower known by the common names Bolander's sunflower and serpentine sunflower. It is native to California and Oregon, where it grows mainly in mountainous areas, often in serpentine soils. It has been found from southwestern Oregon as well as in northern and central California as far south as Santa Cruz County, with reports of a few isolated populations in southern California (some of them from urban areas and very likely cultivated or escaped specimens).

This wild sunflower is an erect annual reaching heights over a meter (40 inches). It has a hairy, rough stem with leaves lance- or oval-shaped, usually pointed, sometimes serrated along the edges, and 3 to 15 centimeters (1.2-6.0 inches) long. The inflorescence holds one or more flower heads, and each plant may have many inflorescences growing along the full length of the stem. The flower head has a cup of long, pointed phyllaries holding an array of bright yellow ray florets each one to two centimeters (0.4-0.8 inches) long around a center of yellow to dark purple or reddish disc florets. The achene is 3 to 5 millimeters (0.12-0.20 inches) long.
