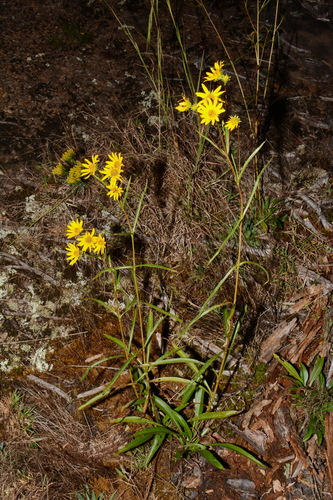

Scientific classification
- Kingdom: Plantae
- Clade: Tracheophytes
- Clade: Angiosperms
- Clade: Eudicots
- Clade: Asterids
- Order: Asterales
- Family: Asteraceae
- Genus: Helianthus
- Species: H. longifolius

Binomial name
- Helianthus longifolius Pursh 1813 not Hook. 1833

Synonyms
- Leighia longifolia (Pursh) Nutt.

= Helianthus longifolius =

Species of sunflower

Helianthus longifolius is a North American species of sunflower known by the common name longleaf sunflower. It is native to the southeastern United States (mostly Georgia and Alabama with one isolated population (probably introduced) in western North Carolina).

Helianthus longifolius is a perennial herb up to 30 cm (1 foot) tall. Most of the leaves are crowded around the base, each leaf up to 30 cm (1 foot) long. Leaves and stems generally have no hairs. One plant usually produces 3-12 flower heads. Each head has 8-13 yellow ray florets surrounding 35 or more yellow disc florets. The plant grows soils derived from sandstone and granite.
