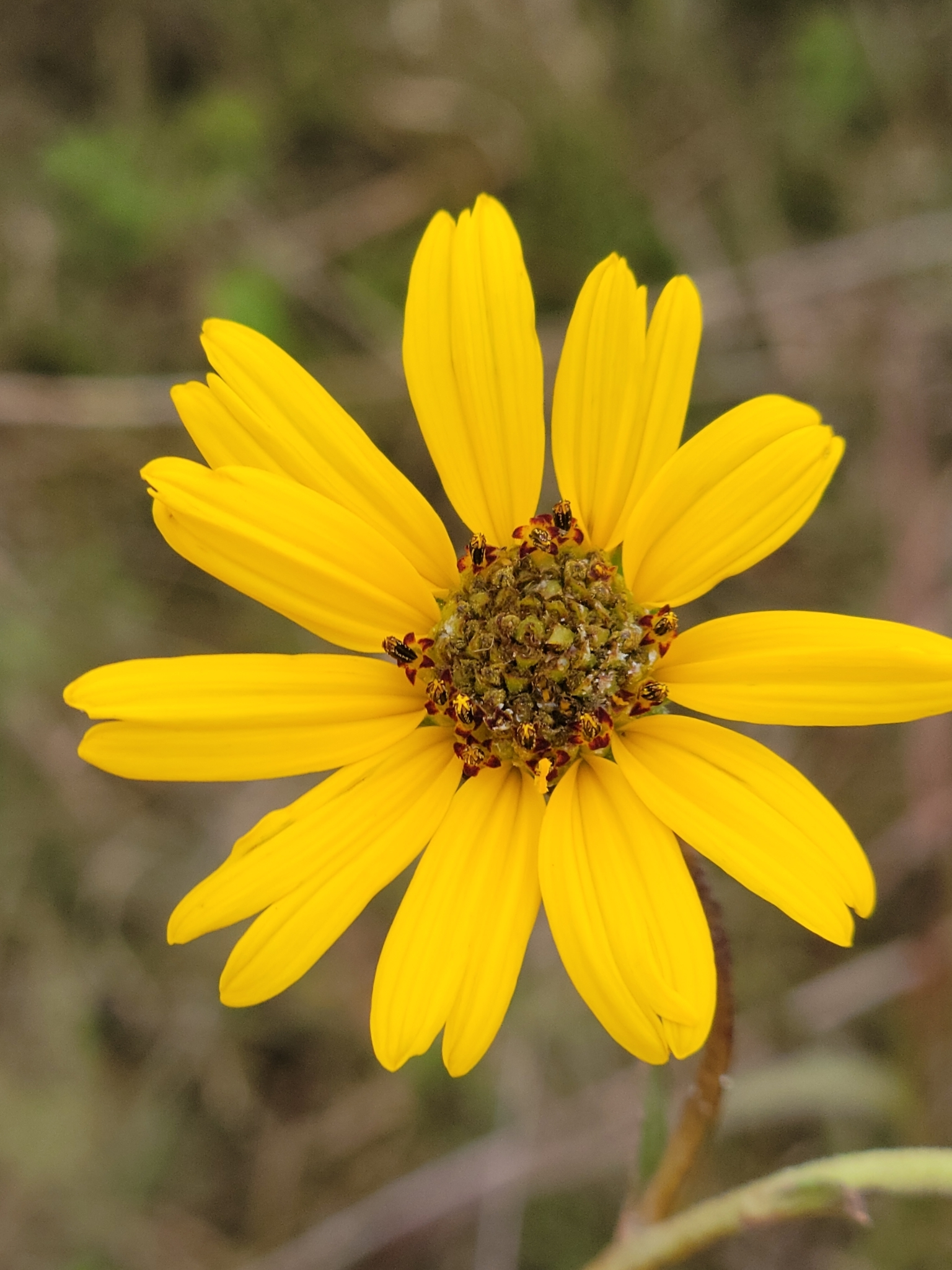

Scientific classification
- Kingdom: Plantae
- Clade: Tracheophytes
- Clade: Angiosperms
- Clade: Eudicots
- Clade: Asterids
- Order: Asterales
- Family: Asteraceae
- Genus: Helianthus
- Species: H. floridanus

Binomial name
- Helianthus floridanus A.Gray ex Chapm.

= Helianthus floridanus =

Species of sunflower

Helianthus floridanus is a species of sunflower known by the common name Florida sunflower. It is native to the southeastern United States, found in all the coastal states from Alabama to North Carolina, plus Louisiana.

Helianthus floridanus is a perennial sometimes as much as 200 cm (almost 7 feet) tall, spreading by means of underground rhizomes. Leaves are long and narrow, up to 15 cm (6 inches) long. It is a perennial herb sometimes as much as 150 cm (5 feet) tall. One plant can produce as many as 6 flower heads, each with 10-20 yellow ray florets surrounding as least 90 red, purple, or yellow disc florets. The species grows in sandy, open areas at low elevations, often near the coast.
