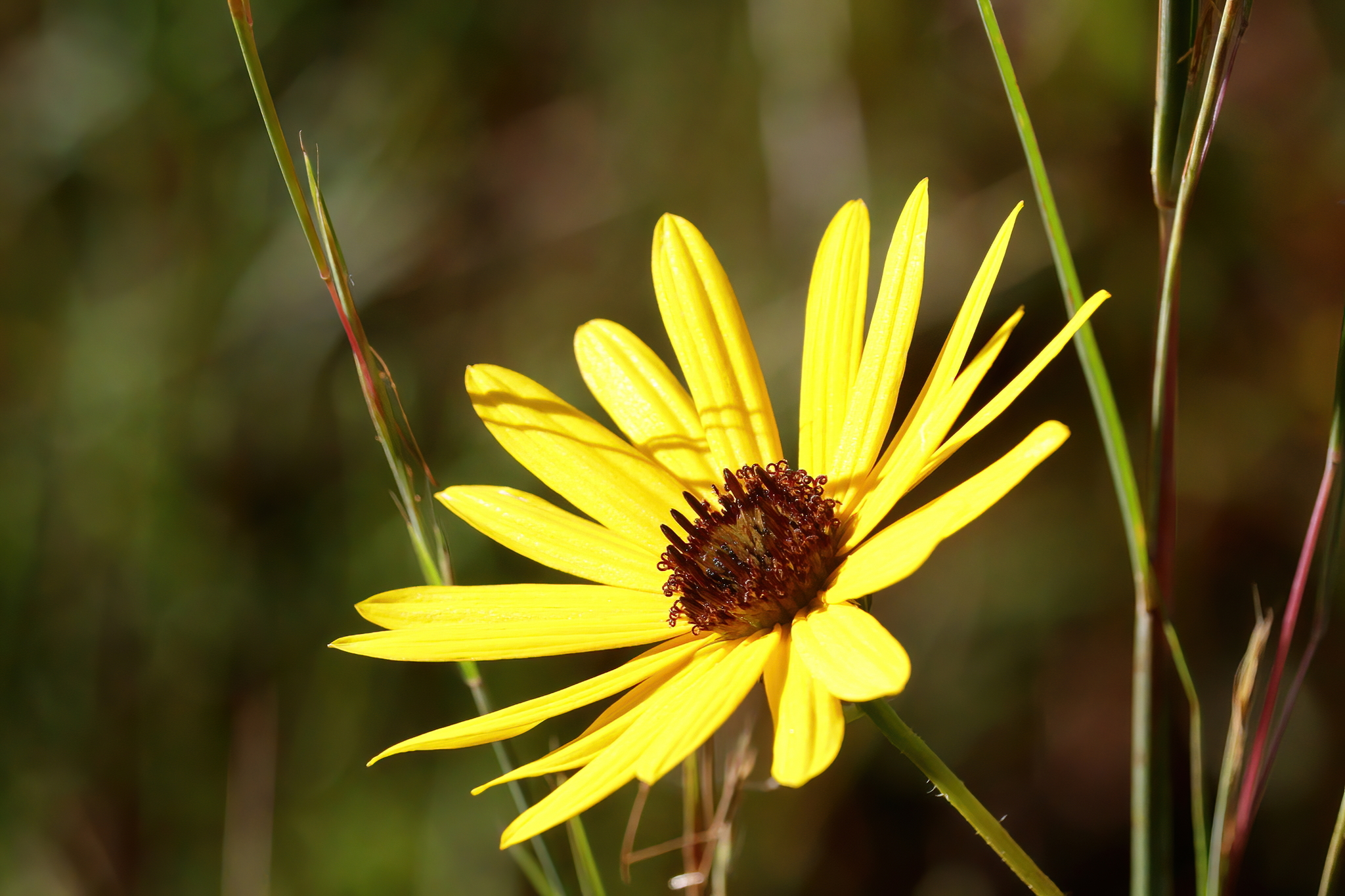

Scientific classification
- Kingdom: Plantae
- Clade: Tracheophytes
- Clade: Angiosperms
- Clade: Eudicots
- Clade: Asterids
- Order: Asterales
- Family: Asteraceae
- Genus: Helianthus
- Species: H. heterophyllus

Binomial name
- Helianthus heterophyllus Nutt. 1834 not Short 1835

Synonyms
- Helianthus elongatus Small

= Helianthus heterophyllus =

Species of sunflower

Helianthus heterophyllus is a species of sunflower known by the common names variableleaf sunflower and wetland sunflower. It is native to the coastal plain of the southern United States from Texas to North Carolina.

Helianthus heterophyllus is a perennial sometimes as much as 120 cm (4 feet) tall, spreading by means of underground rhizomes. Leaves and stems are hairless or almost hairless; leaves appear white on the undersides because of an abundance of wax. One plant can produce 1-5 flower heads, each with 12–18 yellow ray florets surrounding as least 100 red or brown disc florets. The species grows in wet sandy soils at low elevations.
