= Helianthus speciosus =

Scientific classification
- Kingdom: Plantae
- Clade: Tracheophytes
- Clade: Angiosperms
- Clade: Eudicots
- Clade: Asterids
- Order: Asterales
- Family: Asteraceae
- Genus: Helianthus
- Species: H. speciosus

Binomial name
- Helianthus speciosus Hook.

Synonyms
- Leighia speciosa (Hook.) DC.; Tithonia speciosa (Hook.) Hook. ex Griseb.

Species of sunflower

Helianthus speciosus is a Mexican species of sunflower in the family Asteraceae, called the showy Mexican sunflower. It is native to the state of Michoacán in western Mexico.

Helianthus speciosus has 3-lobed leaves and a large flowering head with red ray florets and yellow disc florets. The plant grows to a height of approximately 18 inches (1 1/2 feet or 45 cm).
