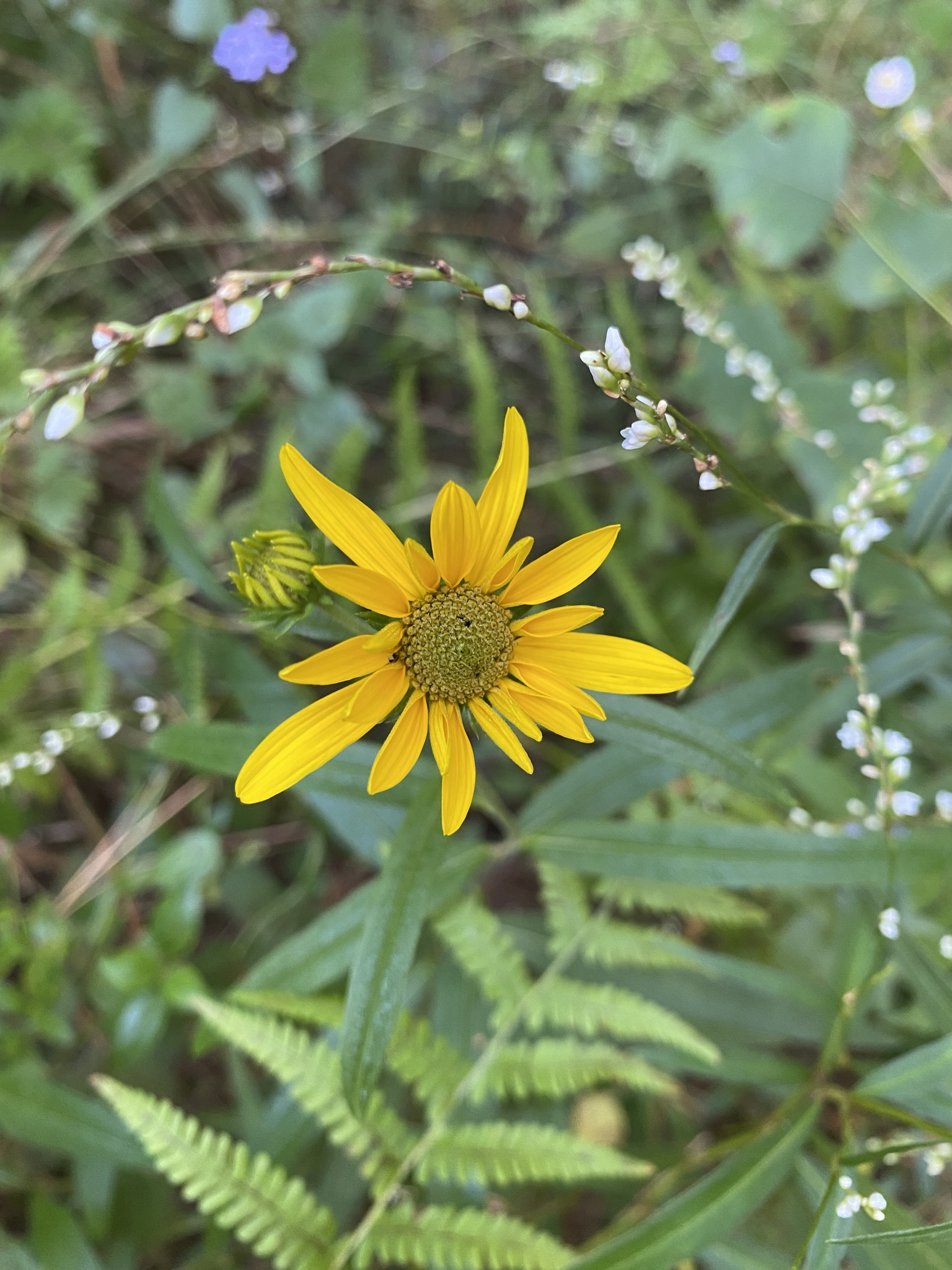

Scientific classification
- Kingdom: Plantae
- Clade: Tracheophytes
- Clade: Angiosperms
- Clade: Eudicots
- Clade: Asterids
- Order: Asterales
- Family: Asteraceae
- Tribe: Heliantheae
- Genus: Helianthus
- Species: H. simulans

Binomial name
- Helianthus simulans Nutt. 1841

= Helianthus simulans =

Species of sunflower

Helianthus simulans is a North American species of sunflower known by the common name muck sunflower. It is native to the southeastern and south-central United States, from eastern Texas to the Carolinas. There are some suggestions that the populations in the eastern half of that range might represent naturalizations.

Helianthus simulans grows in wet, mucky soils in marshes, ditches, and roadsides. It is a perennial herb up to 260 cm (over 8 feet) tall, spreading by means of underground rhizomes. One plant usually produces 1-15 flower heads, each containing 12–23 yellow ray florets surrounding 100 or more red, yellow, or brown disc florets.
