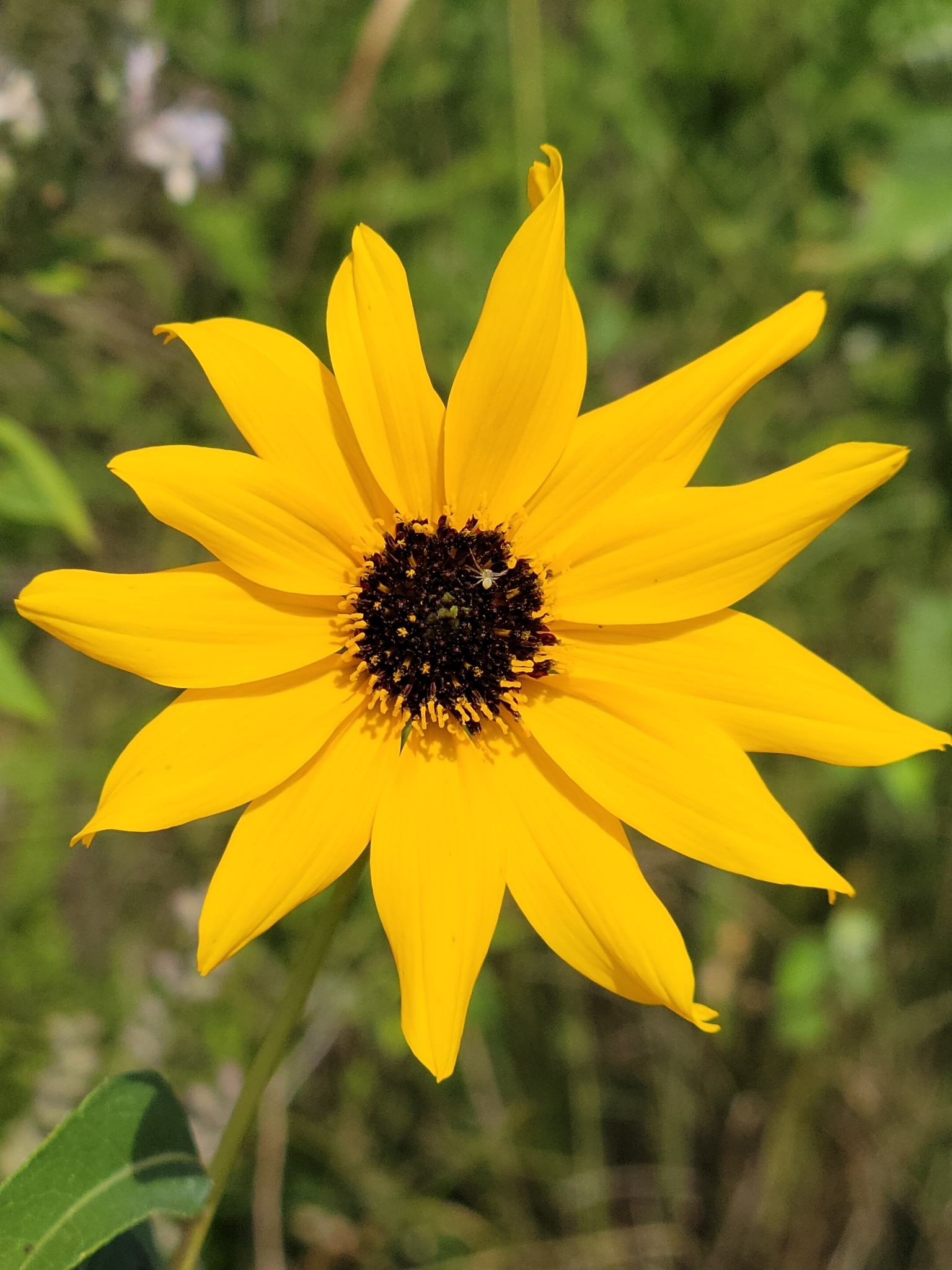

Conservation status
- Secure (NatureServe)

Scientific classification
- Kingdom: Plantae
- Clade: Tracheophytes
- Clade: Angiosperms
- Clade: Eudicots
- Clade: Asterids
- Order: Asterales
- Family: Asteraceae
- Tribe: Heliantheae
- Genus: Helianthus
- Species: H. agrestis

Binomial name
- Helianthus agrestis Pollard

= Helianthus agrestis =

Species of sunflower

Helianthus agrestis is a species of sunflower known by the common name southeastern sunflower. It is one of 150 sunflower species in the genus Helianthus. It is found only in the states of Florida and Georgia in the southeastern United States. This plant is native to Florida. It grows in wet soil in marshes and pine flatwoods at elevations less than 50 meters (170 feet) elevation.

== Description ==
Helianthus agrestis plants can grow up to one meter tall. Helianthus agrestis is a flowering plant that has bright orange-yellow rays. Each plant can have about 10-15 rays and up to 50 disc florets. The bright colors on this plant make it attractive to many pollinators. The leaves of this plant are oval shaped and have a petiolate attachment and alternate on the stem. The stem is branched and hairy with some pubescence.

=== Growth ===
Helianthus agrestis are an annual species that flower in the late summer to early fall months.Helianthus species require a lot of sun to grow. For optimal growth, the plant should get at least 6 hours of full sun a day. Sunflower seeds also contain a toxic substance that will kill all nearby grass.

== Habitat ==
Helianthus agrestis is native to Florida. Outside of Florida, it is also only found in Thomasville, Georgia.

== Significance ==
Helianthus agrestis is a popular plant amongst humans for cosmetic and decorative purposes. In wildlife, birds and small mammals consume Helianthus agrestis seeds. It is primarily pollinated by bees.
