= Helianthus glaucophyllus =

Conservation status
- Vulnerable (NatureServe)

Scientific classification
- Kingdom: Plantae
- Clade: Tracheophytes
- Clade: Angiosperms
- Clade: Eudicots
- Clade: Asterids
- Order: Asterales
- Family: Asteraceae
- Genus: Helianthus
- Species: H. glaucophyllus

Binomial name
- Helianthus glaucophyllus D.M.Sm.

Species of sunflower

Helianthus glaucophyllus is a species of sunflower known by the common name whiteleaf sunflower. It is native to the southeastern United States, in the southern Appalachian Mountains in North Carolina, Tennessee, and South Carolina, in and near Great Smoky Mountains National Park.

Helianthus glaucophyllus is a perennial sometimes as much as 200 cm (almost 7 feet) tall, spreading by means of underground rhizomes. Leaves and stems are hairless or almost hairless; leaves appear white on the undersides because of an abundance of wax. One plant can produce 3-15 flower heads, each with 5-8 yellow ray florets surrounding as least 20–35 yellow disc florets. The species grows in open woodlands on hillsides.
