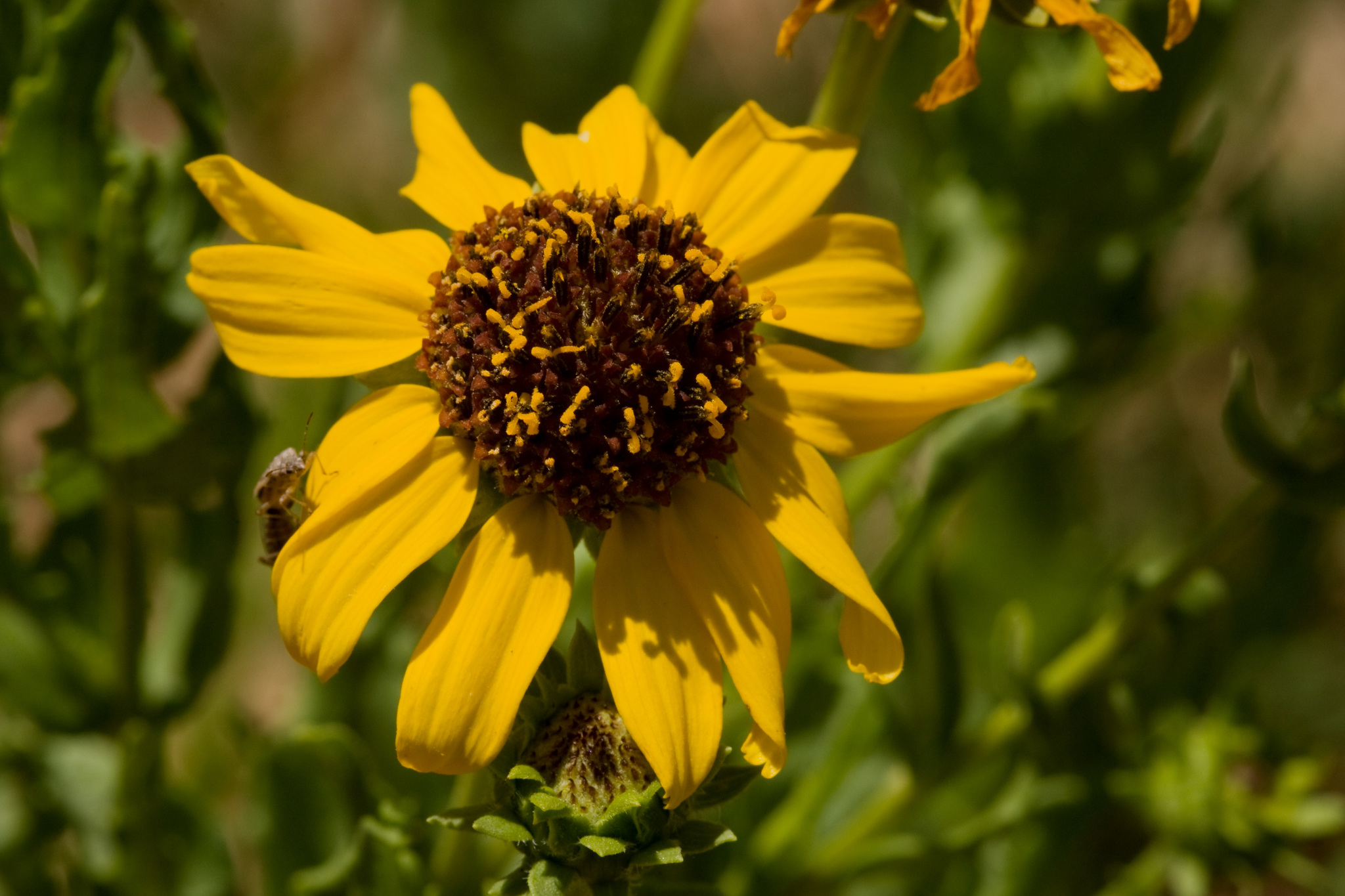

Scientific classification
- Kingdom: Plantae
- Clade: Tracheophytes
- Clade: Angiosperms
- Clade: Eudicots
- Clade: Asterids
- Order: Asterales
- Family: Asteraceae
- Genus: Helianthus
- Species: H. laciniatus

Binomial name
- Helianthus laciniatus A.Gray 1849 not (L.) E.H.L.Krause 1905

Synonyms
- Helianthus crenatus R.C.Jacks.; Helianthus heiseri R.C.Jacks.

= Helianthus laciniatus =

Species of sunflower

Helianthus laciniatus is a North American species of sunflower known by the common name alkali sunflower. It is found in the southwestern United States (southeastern Arizona, southern New Mexico, western Texas) and north-central Mexico (Chihuahua, Coahuila, Nuevo León, Durango). It is fairly common in the Chihuahuan Desert.

Helianthus laciniatus is a perennial herb up to 200 cm (almost 7 feet) tall. Most of the leaves are on the stem rather than clumped together close to the ground, each leaf is up to 9 cm (2.7 inches) long. One plant usually produces 1-9 flower heads. Each head has with 14–20 yellow ray florets surrounding 40 or more red or purple disc florets. The plant grows in dry, alkaline desert soils.
