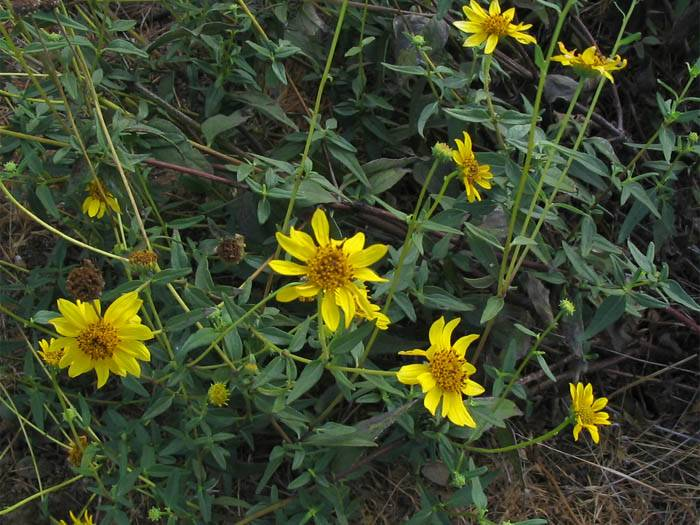

Scientific classification
- Kingdom: Plantae
- Clade: Tracheophytes
- Clade: Angiosperms
- Clade: Eudicots
- Clade: Asterids
- Order: Asterales
- Family: Asteraceae
- Genus: Helianthus
- Species: H. gracilentus

Binomial name
- Helianthus gracilentus Gray

= Helianthus gracilentus =

Species of sunflower

Helianthus gracilentus is a species of sunflower known by the common name slender sunflower. It is native to central and southern California (from Napa County to San Diego County) and Baja California, where it is a member of the dry wildfire-prone chaparral ecosystem, as well as woodland ecosystems.

Helianthus gracilentus is a perennial herb growing from a thick taproot to heights anywhere between one half and two meters (20-60 inches). The lance-shaped, pointed leaves are smooth-edged or slightly toothed and up to about 11 centimeters (4.4 inches) long. The long, slender stems and foliage are covered in rough hairs. The inflorescence bears flower heads with an array of short, hairy phyllaries behind a thick center of yellow to red-brown disc florets. The golden ray florets around the edge are one to three centimeters (0.4-1.2 inches) long. It tends to flower from late spring through fall.
