= Helianthus membranifolius =

Scientific classification
- Kingdom: Plantae
- Clade: Tracheophytes
- Clade: Angiosperms
- Clade: Eudicots
- Clade: Asterids
- Order: Asterales
- Family: Asteraceae
- Genus: Helianthus
- Species: H. membranifolius

Binomial name
- Helianthus membranifolius Poir.

Species of sunflower

Helianthus membranifolius is a species of sunflower in the family Asteraceae. It is native to Cayenne Island in French Guiana, part of the French Republic.
