= List of sunflower diseases =

This article is a list of diseases of sunflowers (Helianthus annuus) and jerusalem artichoke (H. tuberosus).

== Bacterial diseases ==
Bacterial diseases
Apical chlorosis	Pseudomonas syringae pv. tagetis
Bacterial leaf spot	Pseudomonas syringae pv. aptata P. cichorii Pseudomonas syringae pv. helianthi Pseudomonas syringae pv. mellea
Bacterial wilt	Pseudomonas solanacearum
Crown gall	Agrobacterium tumefaciens
Erwinia stalk rot and head rot	Erwinia carotovora subsp. carotovora E. carotovora subsp. atroseptica

== Fungal diseases ==
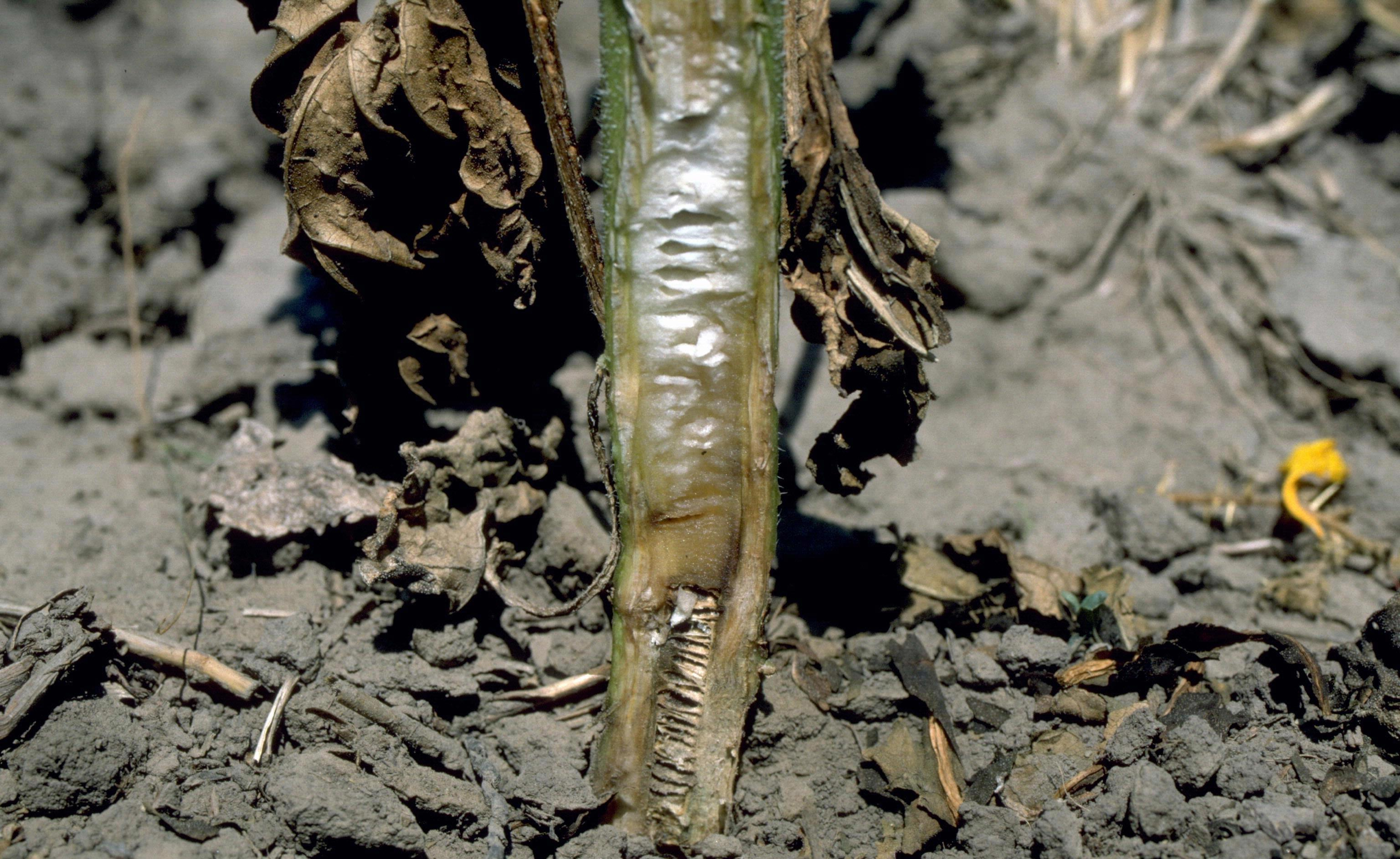
Verticillium dahliae infecting sunflower

Fungal diseases
Alternaria leaf blight, stem spot and head rot	Alternaria alternata = Alternaria tenuis Alternaria helianthi = Helminthosporium helianthi Alternaria helianthicola Alternaria leucanthemi Alternaria tenuissima Alternaria zinniae
Botrytis head rot (gray mold)	Botrytis cinerea Botryotinia fuckeliania [teleomorph]
Charcoal rot	Macrophomina phaseolina = Sclerotium bataticola = Rhizoctonia bataticola
Downy mildew	Plasmopara halstedii Plasmopara helianthi f. helianthi
Fusarium stalk rot	Fusarium equiseti Gibberella intricans [teleomorph] Fusarium solani Nectria haematococca [teleomorph] Microdochium tabacinum = Fusarium tabacinum Monographella cucumerina [teleomorph]
Fusarium wilt	Fusarium moniliforme Gibberella fujikuroi [teleomorph] Fusarium oxysporum
Myrothecium leaf and stem spot	Myrothecium roridum Myrothecium verrucaria
Phialophora yellows	Phialophora asteris
Phoma black stem	Phoma macdonaldii Leptosphaeria lindquistii = Phoma oleracea var. helianthi-tuberosi [teleomorph]
Phomopsis brown stem canker	Phomopsis spp. Phomopsis helianthi Diaporthe helianthi [teleomorph]
Phymatotrichum root rot (cotton root rot)	Phymatotrichopsis omnivora = Phymatotrichum omnivorum
Phytophthora stem rot	Phytophthora spp. Phytophthora drechsleri
Powdery mildew	Golovinomyces latisporus
Pythium seedling blight and root rot	Pythium spp. Pythium aphanidermatum Pythium debaryanum Pythium irregulare
Rhizoctonia seedling blight	Rhizoctonia solani Thanatephorus cucumeris [teleomorph]
Rhizopus head rot	Rhizopus arrhizus = Rhizopus nodosus Rhizopus microsporus Rhizopus stolonifer = Rhizopus nigricans
Rust	Puccinia helianthi Puccinia xanthii Uromyces junci
Sclerotinia basal stalk rot and wilt, mid-stalk rot, head rot	Sclerotinia sclerotiorum = Sclerotinia libertiana = Whetzelinia sclerotiorum
Sclerotinia basal stalk rot and wilt	Sclerotinia minor
Sclerotium basal stalk and root rot (southern blight)	Sclerotium rolfsii Athelia rolfsii [teleomorph]
Septoria leaf spot	Septoria helianthi
Verticillium wilt	Verticillium albo-atrum Verticillium dahliae
White rust	Albugo tragopogonis = Cystopus tragopogonis
Yellow rust	Coleosporium helianthi Coleosporium pacificum = Coleosporium madiae Peridermium californicum [anamorph]

== Nematodes, parasitic ==
Nematodes, parasitic
Dagger, American	Xiphinema americanum
Pin	Paratylenchus projectus
Lesion	Pratylenchus spp. Pratylenchus hexincisus
Reniform	Rotylenchulus spp. Rotylenchulus reniformis
Root knot	Meloidogyne arenaria Meloidogyne incognita Meloidogyne javanica
Spiral	Helicotylenchus sp.
Stunt	Tylenchorhynchus nudus Quinisulcius acutus

== Phytoplasma and Viral diseases ==
Viral diseases
Aster yellows	Aster yellows phytoplasma
Sunflower mosaic	Cucumber mosaic virus
Sunflower virus	Tobacco mosaic virus
Chlorotic Mottle	Sunflower Chlorotic Mottle virus (SuCMoV)
