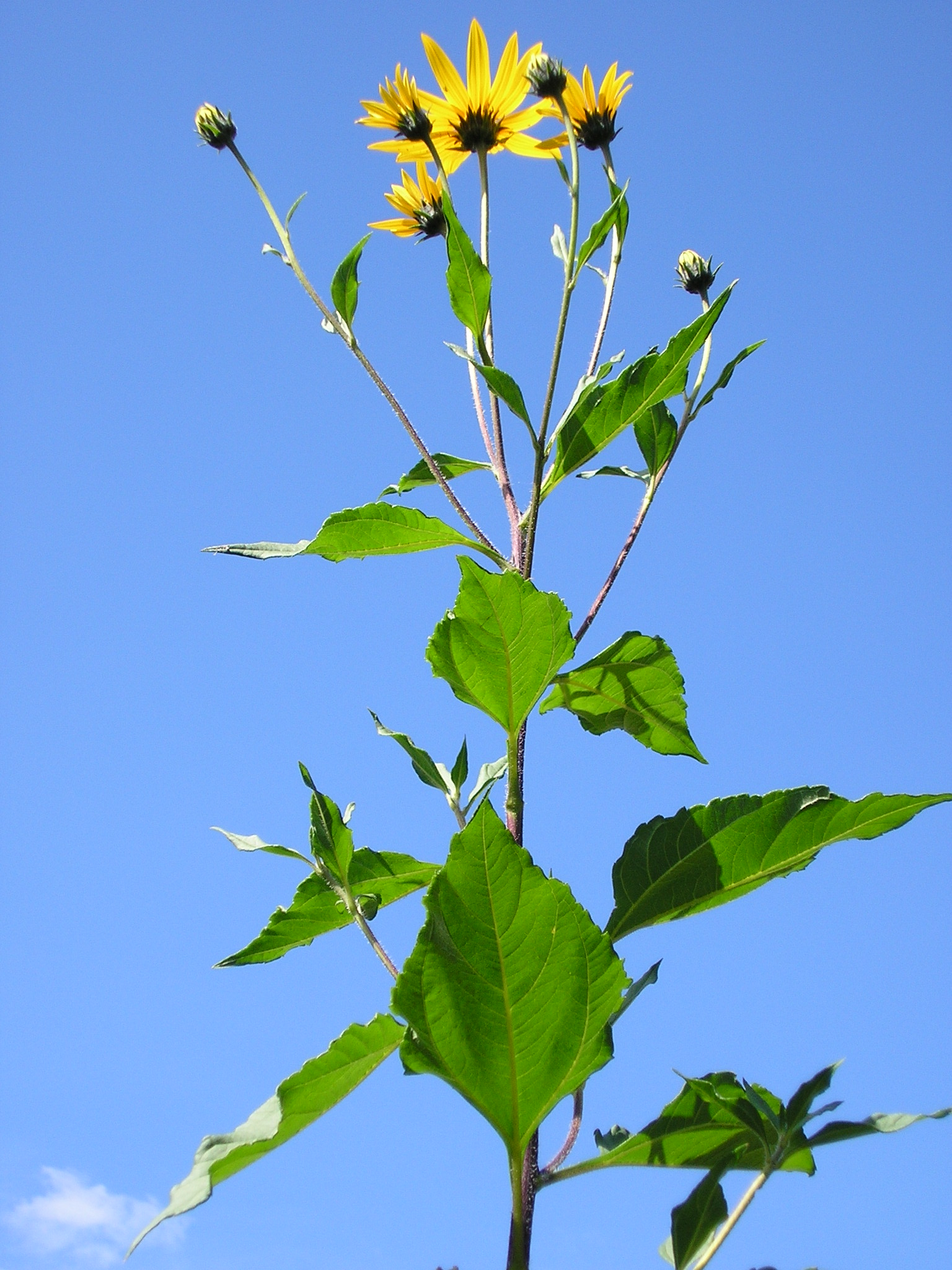
- Stem with flowers
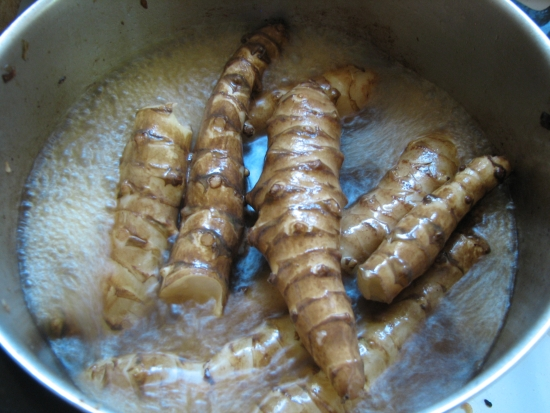
- Jerusalem artichokes cooking

Conservation status
- Least Concern (IUCN 3.1)

Scientific classification
- Kingdom: Plantae
- Clade: Tracheophytes
- Clade: Angiosperms
- Clade: Eudicots
- Clade: Asterids
- Order: Asterales
- Family: Asteraceae
- Tribe: Heliantheae
- Genus: Helianthus
- Species: H. tuberosus

Binomial name
- Helianthus tuberosus L.

Synonyms
- Helianthus esculentus Warsz.; Helianthus serotinus Tausch; Helianthus tomentosus Michx.; Helianthus tuberosus var. subcanescens A.Gray

= Jerusalem artichoke =

Species of sunflower native to eastern North America

The Jerusalem artichoke (Helianthus tuberosus), also called sunroot, sunchoke, wild sunflower, topinambur, or earth apple, is a species of sunflower native to central North America. It is cultivated widely across the temperate zone for its tuber, which is used as a root vegetable.

== Description ==
Helianthus tuberosus is a herbaceous perennial plant growing to 1.5–3 m (4 ft 11 in – 9 ft 10 in) tall with opposite leaves on the lower part of the stem but alternate towards the top. The leaves have a rough, hairy texture. Larger leaves on the lower stem are broad ovoid-acute and can be up to 30 cm (12 in) long. Leaves higher on the stem are smaller and narrower.

The flowers are yellow and produced in capitate flowerheads, which are 5–10 cm (2–4 in) in diameter, with 10–20 ray florets and 60 or more small disc florets. The flowers are briefly fragrant, giving off a light, vanilla-chocolate scent.

The tubers are often elongated and uneven, typically 7.5–10 cm (3–3 7/8 in) long and 3–5 cm (1–2 in) thick, and vaguely resembling a ginger root in appearance, with a crisp and crunchy texture when raw. They vary in color from pale brown to white, red, or purple.

== Culinary use ==
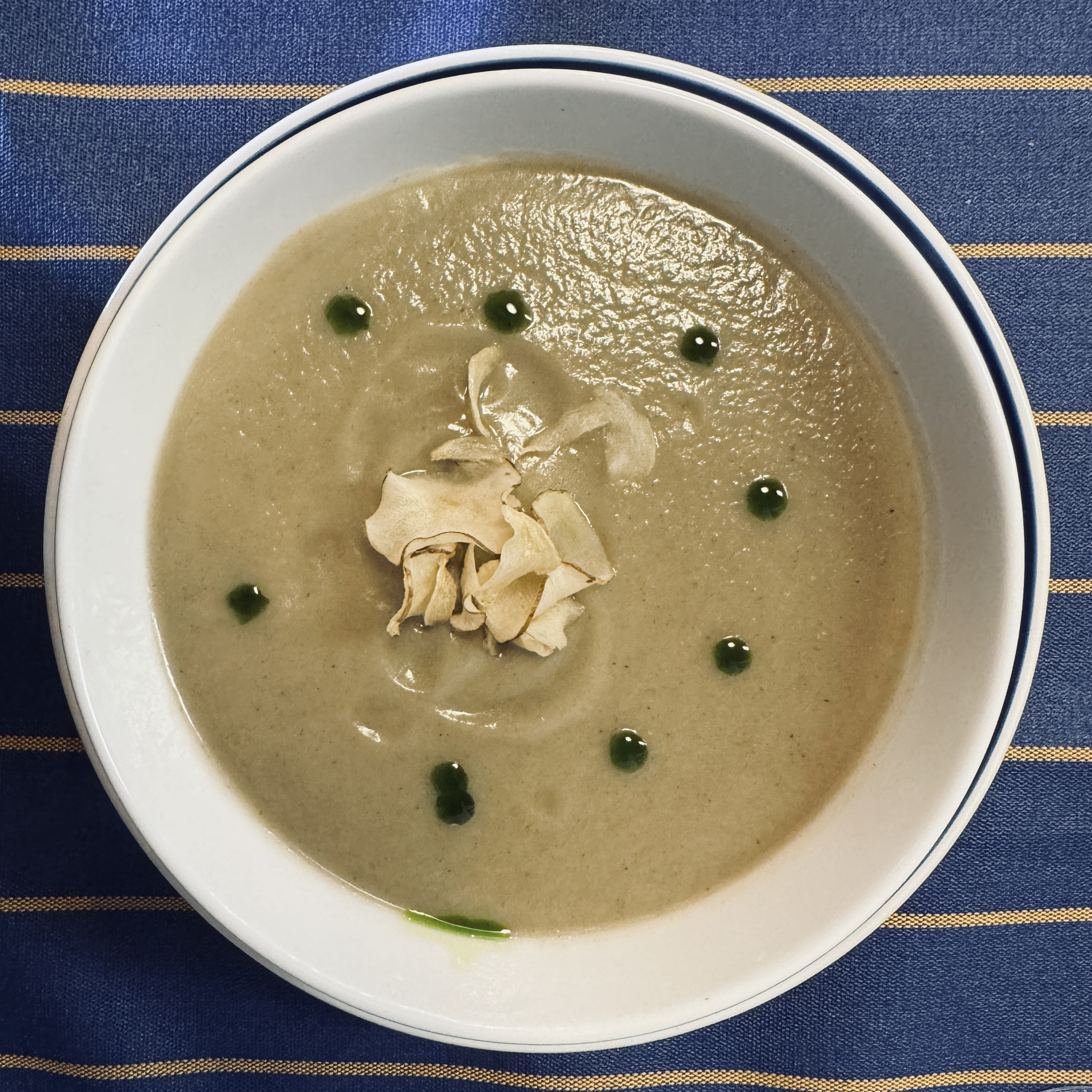
A bowl of Jerusalem artichoke soup at a French restaurant in California

The tubers can be eaten raw, cooked, or pickled.

Before the arrival of Europeans, indigenous peoples cultivated H. tuberosus as a food source. The tubers persist for years after being planted, so the species expanded its range from central North America to the eastern and western regions. Early European colonists learned of this and sent tubers back to Europe, where they became a popular crop and naturalized there. It later gradually fell into obscurity in North America, but attempts to market it commercially were successful in the late 1900s and early 2000s.

The tuber contains about 2% protein, no oil, and little starch. It is rich in the carbohydrate inulin (8 to 13%), which is a polymer of the monosaccharide fructose. Tubers stored for any length of time convert their inulin into its component, fructose. Jerusalem artichokes have an underlying sweet taste because of the fructose, which is about one and a half times as sweet as sucrose.

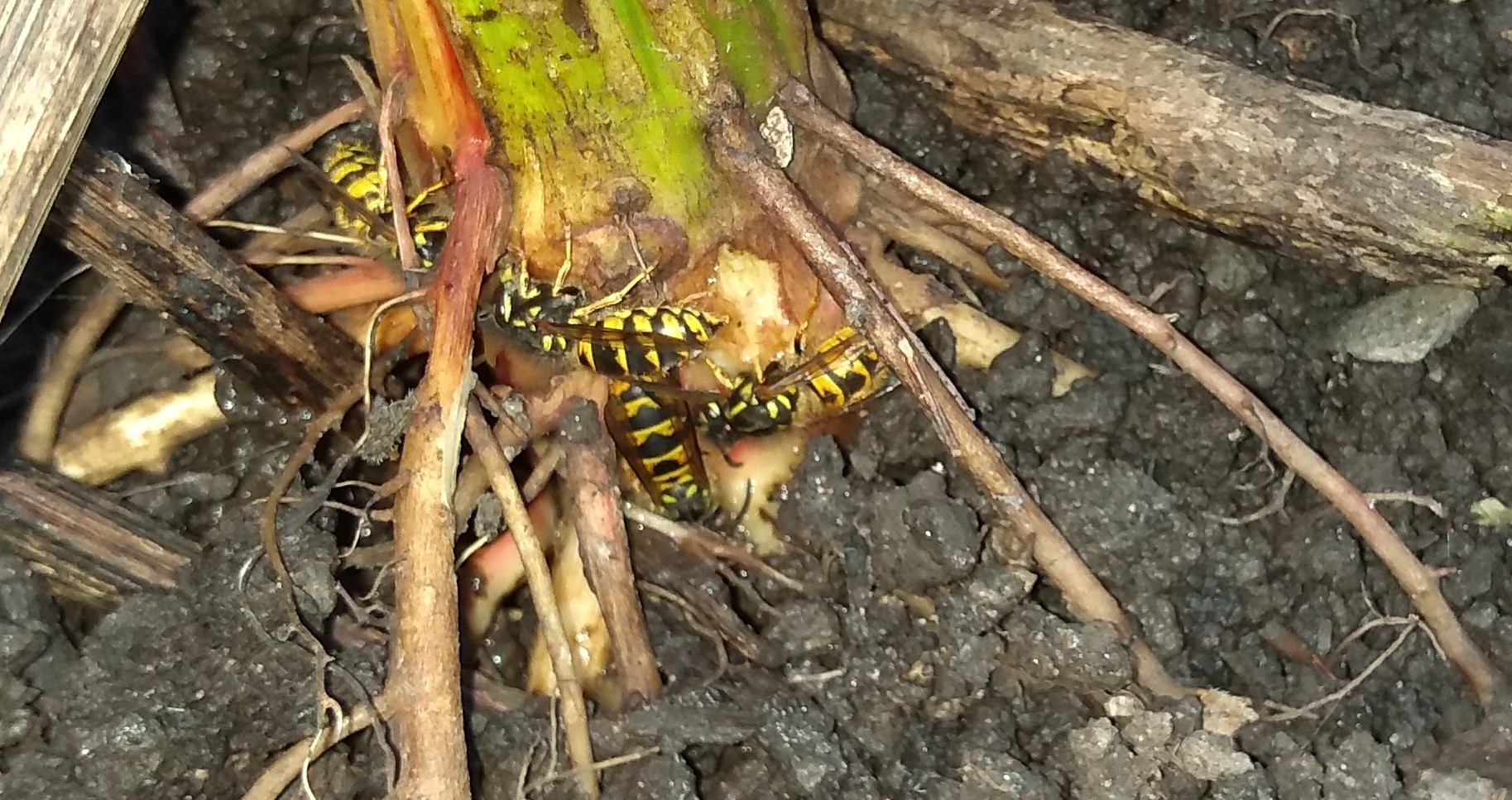
Wasps feeding on the stems of Jerusalem artichokes

It has also been reported as a folk remedy for diabetes: since inulin is not assimilated in the intestine, it does not cause a glycemic spike as potatoes would. Temperature variances have been shown to affect the amount of inulin the Jerusalem artichoke can produce. It makes less inulin in a colder region than when it is in a warmer region.

== Etymology ==
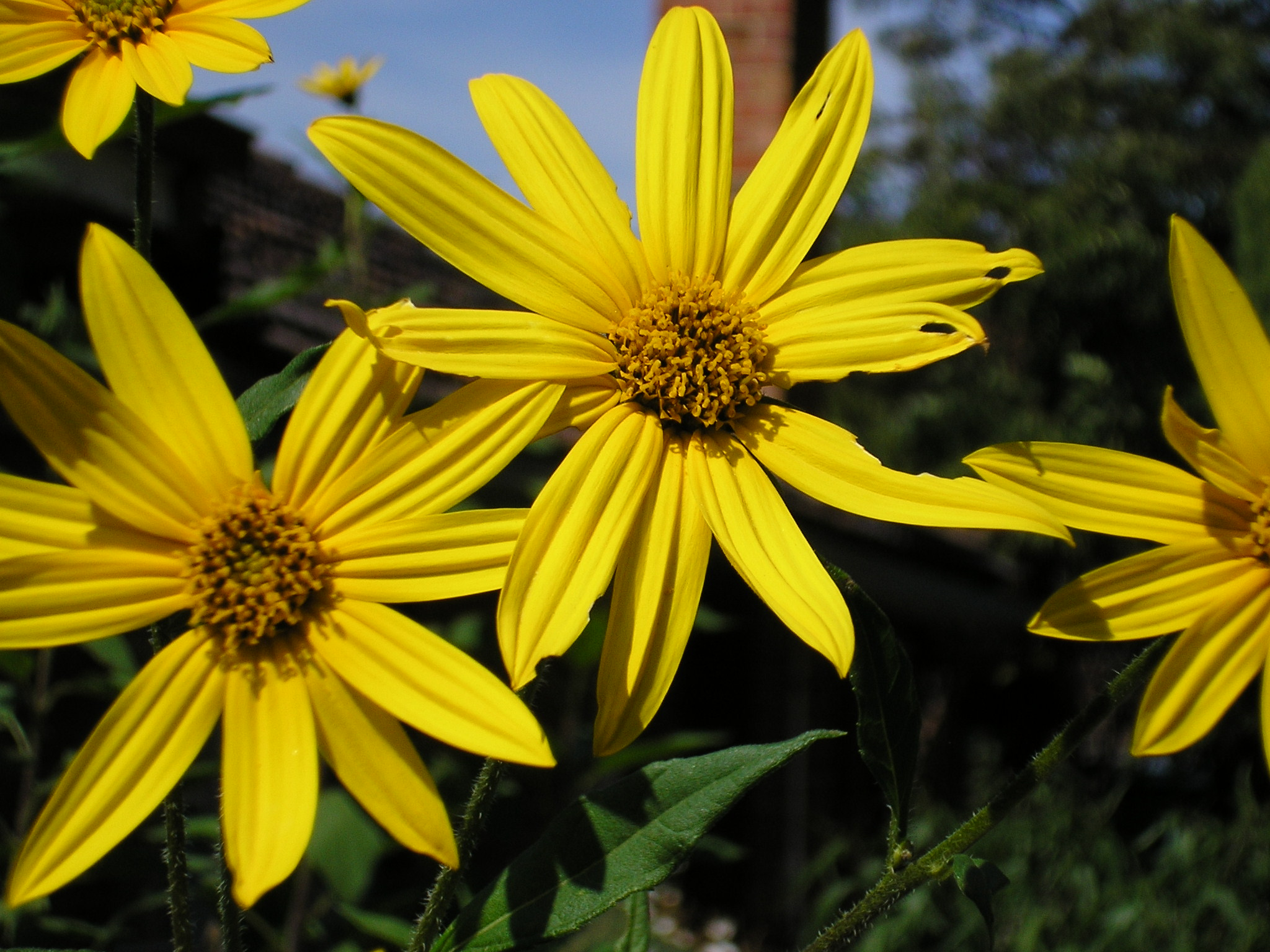
Jerusalem artichoke flowers

The Jerusalem artichoke has no relationship to Jerusalem, and it is not a type of artichoke, though the two are distantly related as members of the daisy family. The most probable explanation is that Italian settlers in the United States called the plant girasole, the Italian word for sunflower, because of its familial relationship to the garden sunflower (both plants are members of the genus Helianthus). Over time, the name girasole (pronounced closer to [dʒiraˈsuːlə] in Neapolitan) was corrupted by English-speakers to Jerusalem. Various other names have been applied to the plant, such as the French or Canada potato, topinambour, and lambchoke. Sunroot is a literal translation of the Virginia Algonquian term kaishucpenauk this naming is similarly reflected in Ojibwe as ᑮᓯᓲᒌᐱᒃ giizisoojiibik. Sunchoke, a marketing name by which it is still known today in the US, was invented in the 1960s by Frieda Caplan, a produce wholesaler trying to revive the plant's appeal.

The artichoke part of the Jerusalem artichoke's name comes from the taste of the cooked tuber. Samuel de Champlain, the French explorer, sent the first samples of the plant to France, noting it had a taste similar to that of artichoke.

The name topinambur, in one account, is attributed to the Brazilian coastal tribe called the Tupinambá, several members of which were brought to France in 1613 at the same time that the tubers were beginning to make an appearance on French tables. The New World connections were conflated, the plant being misattributed to Brazil, resulting in the name toupinambeaux (earliest known use 1618) being applied to the tubers in French. By 1658, topinambour is found. From there, the word made its way into other European languages.

== Cultural significance ==
According to Iroquois mythology, the first Jerusalem artichokes grew out of Earth Woman's feet after she died giving birth to her twin sons, Sapling and Flint.

== History ==
Jerusalem Artichoke Flowers by Claude Monet, 1880

Jerusalem artichokes were first cultivated by the Indigenous peoples of the Americas, though the exact native range of the species is unknown. Genome analysis has ruled out the common sunflower (also originating in the Americas) as an ancestor, and instead points to hybridization between the hairy sunflower and the sawtooth sunflower.

The French explorer Samuel de Champlain discovered that the native people of Nauset Harbor in Massachusetts had cultivated roots that tasted like artichoke. The following year, Champlain returned to the same area to discover that the roots had a flavor similar to chard and was responsible for bringing the plant back to France. Sometime later, Petrus Hondius, a Dutch botanist, planted a shriveled Jerusalem artichoke tuber in his garden at Terneuzen and was surprised to see the plant proliferate. Jerusalem artichokes are so well-suited for the European climate and soil that the plant multiplies quickly. By the mid-1600s, the Jerusalem artichoke had become a very common vegetable for human consumption in Europe and the Americas and was also used for livestock feed in Europe and colonial America. The French were particularly fond of the vegetable, which reached its peak popularity at the turn of the 19th century. The Jerusalem artichoke was titled 'best soup vegetable' in the 2002 Nice Festival for the Heritage of French Cuisine.

The French explorer and Acadia's first historian Marc Lescarbot described Jerusalem artichokes as being "as big as turnips or truffles," suitable for eating and taste "like chards, but more pleasant." In 1629, the English herbalist and botanist John Parkinson wrote that the widely grown Jerusalem artichoke had become very common and cheap in London, so much so "that even the most vulgar begin to despise them." In contrast, when they had first arrived in England, the tubers had been "dainties for the Queen."

Lewis and Clark ate the tubers, prepared by an indigenous woman, in modern-day North Dakota.

They have also been called the "Canadian truffle".

== Invasive potential ==
=== Biological characteristics ===
Its rapid growth and its ability to reproduce from buried rhizomes and tubers facilitates the Jerusalem artichoke's uncontrolled spread. The vegetative propagules can be transported via rivers and water streams and begin a new population on riverbanks. Dispersal by animal is also possible, as animals feed on tubers and rhizomes and excrete the propagules in new areas. With humans' cultivation, there is also a risk of the plant's unintended escape into the wild. It can also be propagated by seed. Its relatively long flower period enables the Jerusalem artichoke to increase its reproductive potential.

=== Origins and distribution ===
Originating in North America, the Jerusalem artichoke can now be found in several countries in North and South America, Europe, Asia, and Australia. In Central Europe it is one of the most expanding invasive plant species. It can grow in many geo-climatic regions and different types of soils. However, Jerusalem artichoke prefers moist habitats and seems to be less tolerant of dry conditions.

=== Suppression of other native plant species ===
Because of its ecological and biological attributes, the Jerusalem artichoke is highly competitive with other plant species. For instance, the carbohydrates in the tubers serve as an energy source for rapid growth in spring. The plant expands rapidly and creates shading, which has a suppressing effect on neighbouring plants. Therefore, the risk of outcompeting and repressing the growth of other native plants is increased.

== Cultivation and use ==
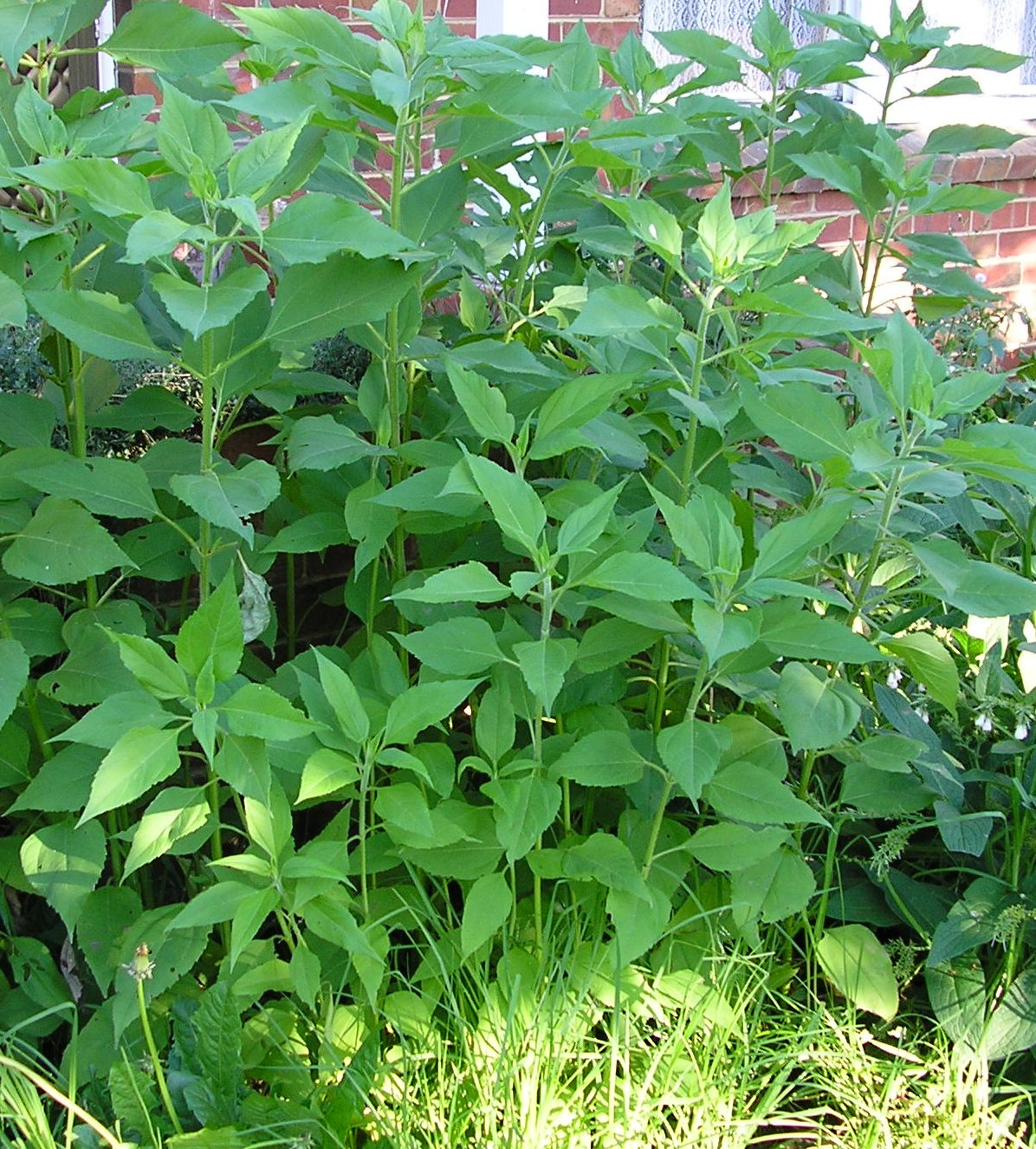
Young plants in a garden

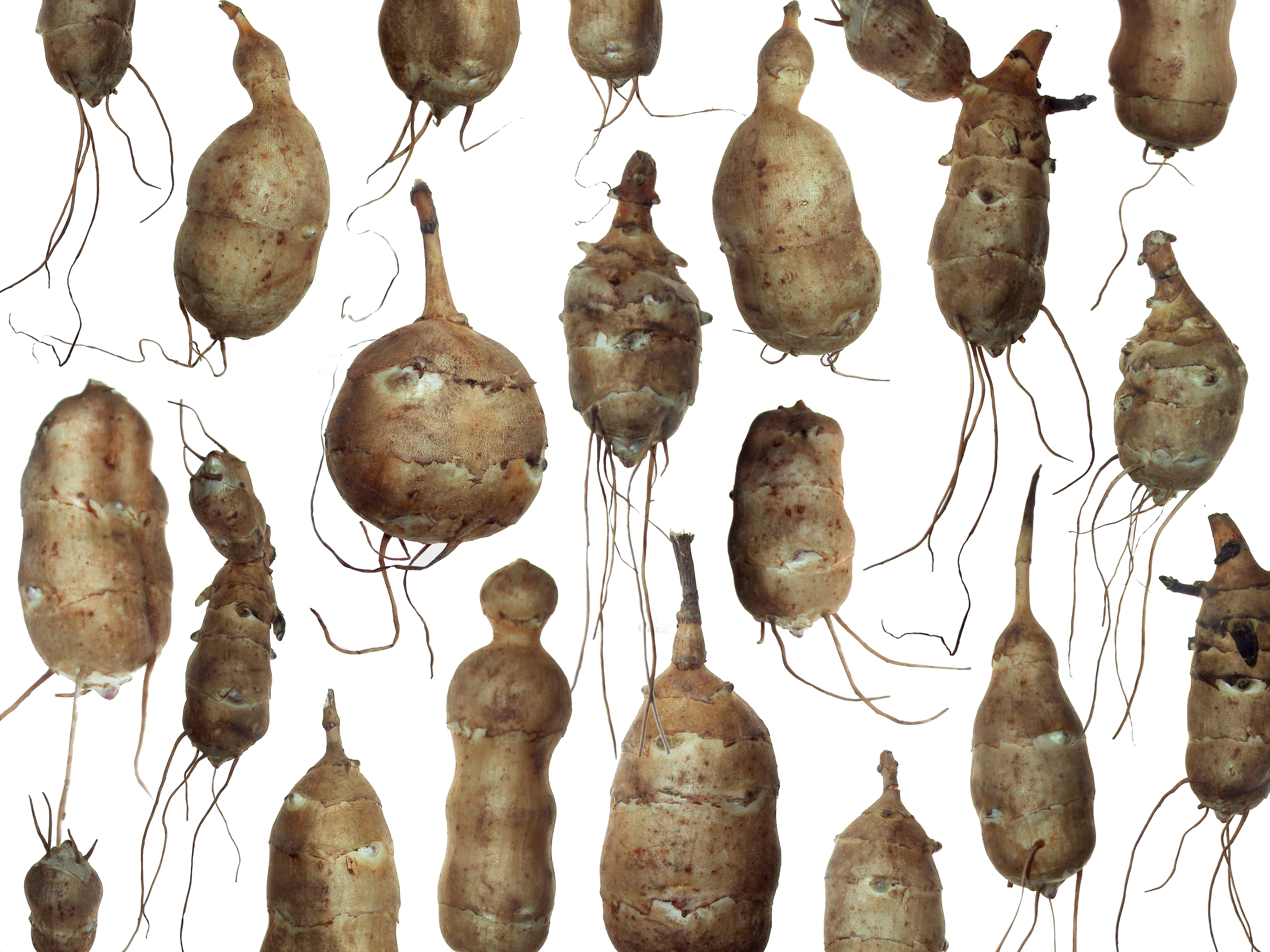
Jerusalem artichoke tuber collage

Unlike most tubers, but in common with many other members of the Asteraceae (including the artichoke), Jerusalem artichoke tubers store their carbohydrates as the polysaccharide inulin (not to be confused with the peptide insulin) rather than as starch. This has made them an important source of inulin used as a dietary fiber in food manufacturing.

Jerusalem artichoke can propagate with seeds and tubers but the use of tubers leads to higher yields. For planting, the tubers are cut into pieces with three to five buds that are placed in 5–10 centimetres (2–4 in) depth in the soil. Jerusalem artichoke has low nutrient requirements and needs less nitrogen than other energy crops. The competitiveness against weeds is high, making weed control easier but also making it harder to grow a different culture afterward, since some small tubers usually remain in the ground after harvest. The plant's high competitiveness may be due to allelopathic effects, high plant size, and rapid growth rate.

Crop yields are high, typically 16–20 tonnes per hectare (7–9 short ton/acre) for tubers, and 18–28 tonnes per hectare (8–12 short ton/acre) green weight for foliage. Tubers remaining in the ground lie dormant over winter and can handle temperatures as low as −30 °C (−22 °F). Jerusalem artichoke also has potential for production of ethanol fuel, using inulin-adapted strains of yeast for fermentation.

The tubers are used for cooking and baking in the same ways as potatoes, but unlike the potato, they can also be eaten raw. They have a similar consistency and, in their raw form, have a similar texture but a sweeter, nuttier flavor. When raw and sliced thinly, they are fit for a salad. Their inulin form of carbohydrates give the tubers a tendency to become soft and mushy if boiled, but they retain their texture better when steamed. The inulin cannot be broken down by the human digestive system but bacteria metabolize it in the colon. This can cause flatulence and, in some cases, gastric pain. John Gerard's Herbal, printed in 1621, quotes the English botanist John Goodyer on Jerusalem artichokes:

which way soever they be dressed and eaten, they stir and cause a filthy loathsome stinking wind within the body, thereby causing the belly to be pained and tormented, and are a meat more fit for swine than men.

Jerusalem artichokes have 650 mg potassium per 1 cup (150 g) serving. They are also high in iron and contain 10–12% of the USRDA of fiber, niacin, thiamine, phosphorus, and copper.

=== Use as forage ===
In former times, Jerusalem artichoke was used as forage for domesticated cattle, horses, and pigs. The plant has valuable nutrient contents and various bioactive compounds, and so is used today as an animal feed source or for the health of several animal species. Pigs, for example, can eat the tuber either dried or directly from the ground or the green plant biomass (stalks and leaves) from the pasture. Washed Jerusalem artichoke tubers can be fed to many animals, and silage produced from the harvested stalks and leaves. The silage has high nutrient values and satisfactory digestion performance for ruminants. Its high inulin content beneficially affects the rumen metabolism and microflora. However, cutting the tops to produce silage greatly reduces the harvest of the tubers. There are also many other Jerusalem artichoke products on the market, such as supplementary feed for horses, dogs, and small animals.

Jerusalem artichokes, raw
Nutritional value per 100 g (3.5 oz)
- Energy: 304 kJ (73 kcal)
- Carbohydrates: 17.44 g
- Sugars: 9.6 g
- Dietary fiber: 1.6 g
- Fat: 0.01 g
- Protein: 2 g
Vitamins and minerals
Vitamins	Quantity %DV^{†}
Thiamine (B1)	17% 0.2 mg
Riboflavin (B2)	5% 0.06 mg
Niacin (B3)	8% 1.3 mg
Pantothenic acid (B5)	8% 0.397 mg
Vitamin B6	5% 0.077 mg
Folate (B9)	3% 13 μg
Vitamin C	4% 4 mg
Minerals	Quantity %DV^{†}
Calcium	1% 14 mg
Iron	19% 3.4 mg
Magnesium	4% 17 mg
Phosphorus	6% 78 mg
Potassium	14% 429 mg
- Link to USDA Database entry
- ^{†}Percentages estimated using US recommendations for adults, except for potassium, which is estimated based on expert recommendation from the National Academies.

=== Fermented products ===
In Baden-Württemberg, Germany, over 90% of the Jerusalem artichoke crop is used to produce a spirit called Topinambur, the German word for Jerusalem artichoke. By the end of the 19th century, the tubers were being used in Baden to make a spirit called "Topinambur-Branntwein" (Jerusalem artichoke brandy), "Topinambur" (Jerusalem artichoke), "Topi", "Erdäpfler", "Rossler", or "Borbel". Topinambur produced in the European Union and Switzerland must be made exclusively from Jerusalem artichokes, contain at least 38% alcohol by volume, and contain neither added alcohol nor flavorings. Caramel color is the only permitted additive.

Jerusalem artichoke brandy smells fruity and has a slight nutty-sweet flavor. An intense, pleasant, earthy note characterizes it. The tubers are washed and dried in an oven before being fermented and distilled. It can be further refined to make "Red Rossler" by adding the roots of the common tormentil, giving it a bitter and astringent taste and a red color. Red Rossler contains other ingredients such as currants, producing a schnapps with about 50% alcohol used as digestif and as a folk remedy for diarrhea or abdominal pain.

=== US marketing scheme ===
In the 1980s, the Jerusalem artichoke also gained some notoriety when its seeds were planted by Midwestern US farmers at the prodding of an agricultural attempt to save the family farm. This effort aimed to teach independent farmers to raise their own food, feed, and fuel. Little market existed for the tuber in that part of the US then, but contacts were made with sugar producers, oil and gas companies, and the fresh food market for markets to be developed. Fructose had not yet been established as a mainstay, nor was ethanol used as a main fuel additive as it is today. The only real profit in this effort was realized by a few first-year growers (who sold some of their seed to other farmers individually as well as with the help of the company attempting this venture). As a result, many of the farmers who had planted large quantities of the crop lost money.

== Diseases and pests ==
Stem rot disease is caused by the fungus Agroathelia rolfsii (aka Sclerotium rolfsii or Athelia rolfsii), which is one of the most important pathogens causing tuber and stem rot and up to 60% loss in Jerusalem artichoke yield. Growing resistant varieties is an important method of controlling Agroathelia rolfsii.

Main diseases and pests that infest Jerusalem artichoke
Diseases of Jerusalem artichoke
Stem rot (Agroathelia rolfsii)
White mold (Sclerotinia sclerotiorum)
Sclerotinia blight (Sclerotinia minor)
Powdery mildew (Golovinomyces latisporus)
Rust (Puccinia helianthi)
Alternaria blight (Alternaria helianthi)
Pseudomonas syringe pv. tagetis
Pests of Jerusalem artichoke
Tobacco cutworm (Spodoptera litura)
Banded sunflower moth (Cochylis hospes)
