= Perennial sunflower =

Cross between wild perennial and domestic annual sunflower species

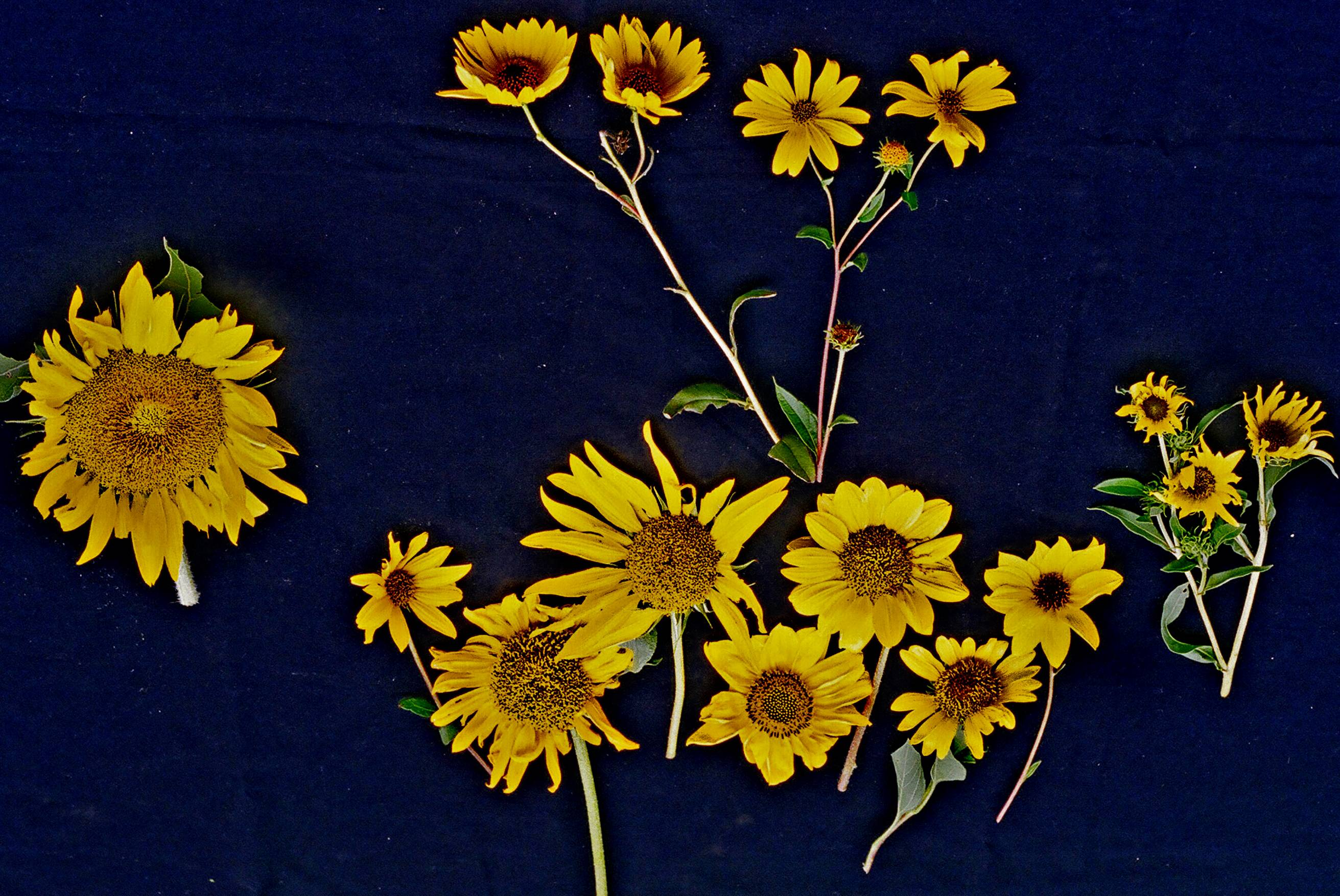

Perennial sunflower is a crop of sunflowers that are developed by crossing wild perennial and domestic annual sunflower species.

Annual sunflower is a major oilseed crop. Genes from wild perennial relatives may increase root depth and mass and extend the growing season. These upgrades means future varieties with higher yields and better soil conservation.

== Background ==
=== Sunflower seed: current production and uses ===
Globally, sunflowers are the fourth most important oil crop. Most of the sunflower seed crop is crushed for oil, and most of the oil is consumed by humans. A major byproduct of crushing is protein-rich cake, an excellent feed for livestock.

A tiny proportion of the global sunflower crop is directly eaten as “nuts” or kernels.

Sunflower seed in the context of global oilseed production (FAO data)

Global uses of sunflower seed (from FAO data)

=== Wild perennial relatives of sunflower ===
There are 82 species of sunflowers (genus Helianthus), all native to North America. Of these, 38 are perennials. Sunflower breeders have crossed many of these species with the crop sunflower because they are a source of useful genes.

All wild sunflower species	Perennial sunflower species	The domestic sunflower
Wild species supply genes for conventional breeding programs	Wild perennials are a source of genes for perennial grain breeding	Annual crop sunflower is a source of genes for perennial grain breeding
drought resistance; new types of oils; disease resistance	deep, persistent roots; rhizomes; tubers; cold tolerance; spring emergence	Large seeds; Shatter resistance; Fast germination and seedling growth; High seed yields

Perennial sunflowers survive the winter by storing food in underground freezing-tolerant stems called rhizomes. Rhizomes enable a plant to spread into new territory. Tubers are storage organs and are modified rhizomes.

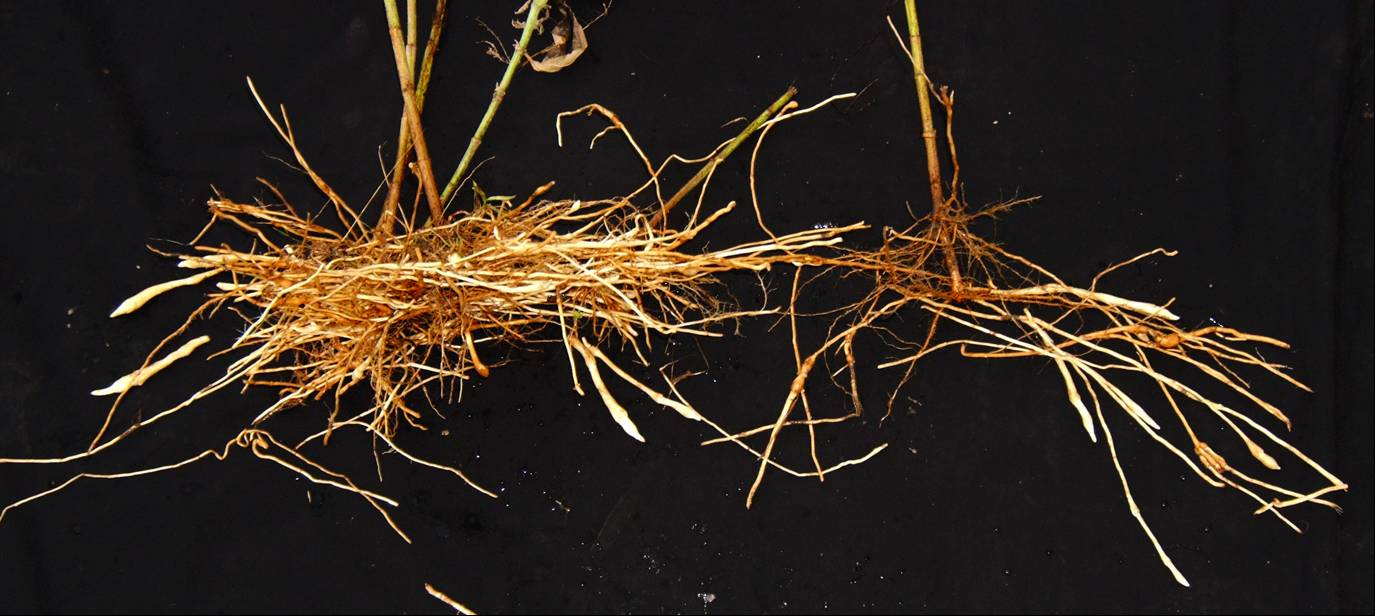
Helianthus tuberosus rhizomes and tubers

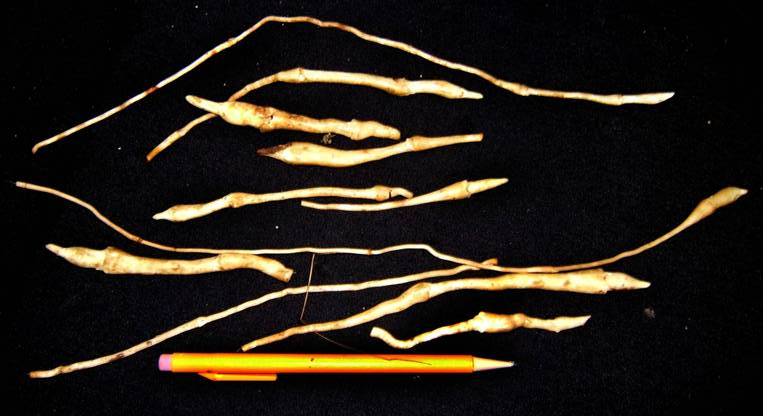
Wild helianthus tuberosus tubers

Helianthus maximilianii rhizomes

=== Jerusalem Artichoke: the other perennial sunflower ===
Native Americans domesticated the wild perennial sunflower Helianthus tuberosus by selecting individuals with larger tubers. This crop plant (now called by the misleading name Jerusalem artichoke) was grown for its tubers and not for its seed. The perennial sunflowers being developed as an oilseed crop by modern plant breeders may have tubers, but they will probably not be harvested. Digging tubers is probably ecologically sustainable on a small scale. On a large scale, annually disturbing the soil makes it vulnerable to soil erosion. Avoiding annual tillage is one of the main motivations for developing perennial grain crops.

== Breeding perennial sunflower ==
=== Combining genes from wild and crop species ===

Many sunflower species can be artificially hybridized but one group of wild perennial species cross; the hexaploids (six copies of all chromosomes instead of the usual two copies) are especially easy to cross. Scientists are using this group to make “bridging crosses” that will bring together the genes from the crop sunflower and several other perennial species.

Researchers at The Land Institute have made many tetraploid hybrids like the ones shown here. More than 50 are known to be perennial and winter-hardy. These plants are remarkably diverse in appearance, including variation for head size, color, leaf shape, height. Plant breeders at The University of Minnesota have made similar tetraploid hybrids

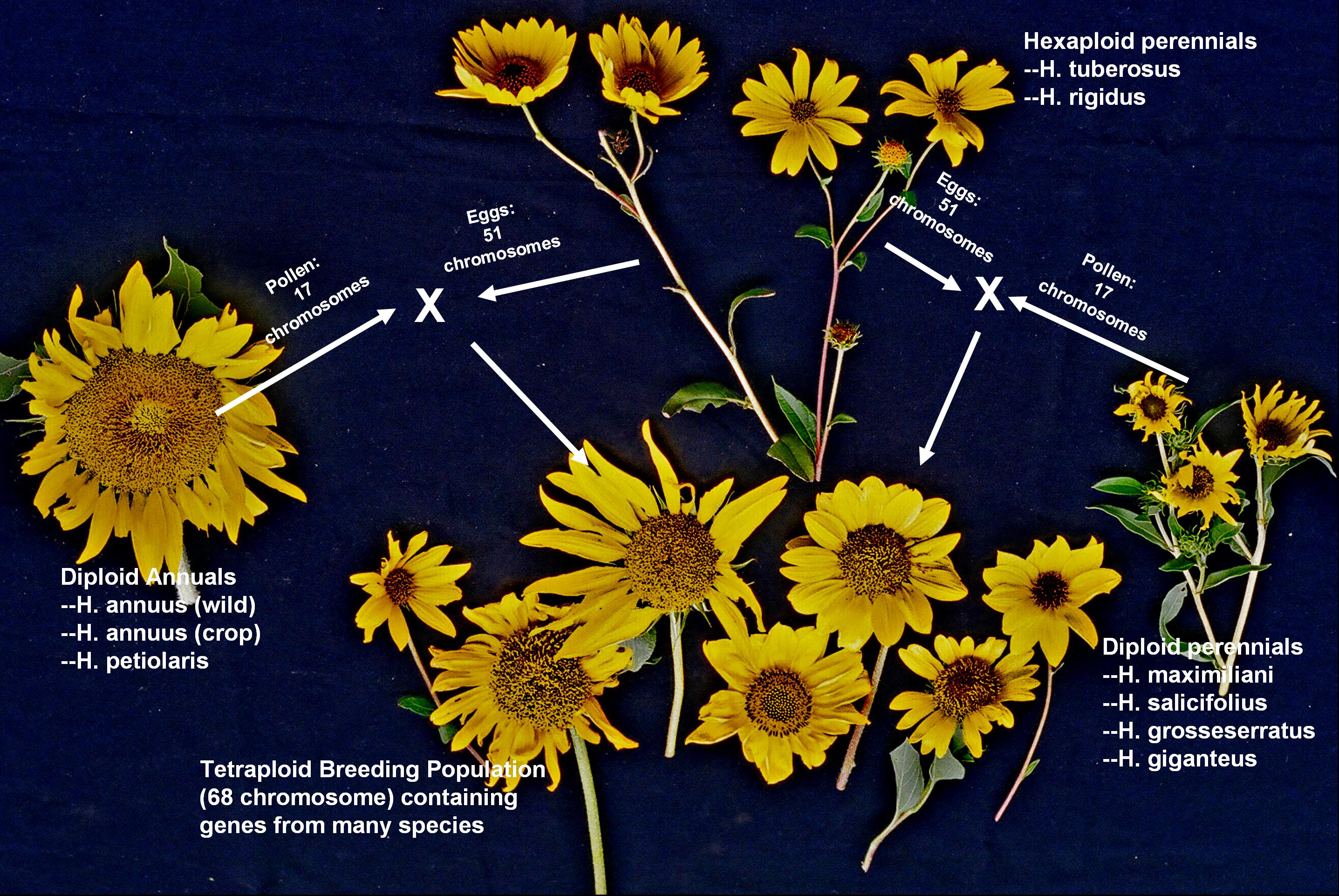
Examples of interspecific hybridization within the genus Helianthus.
