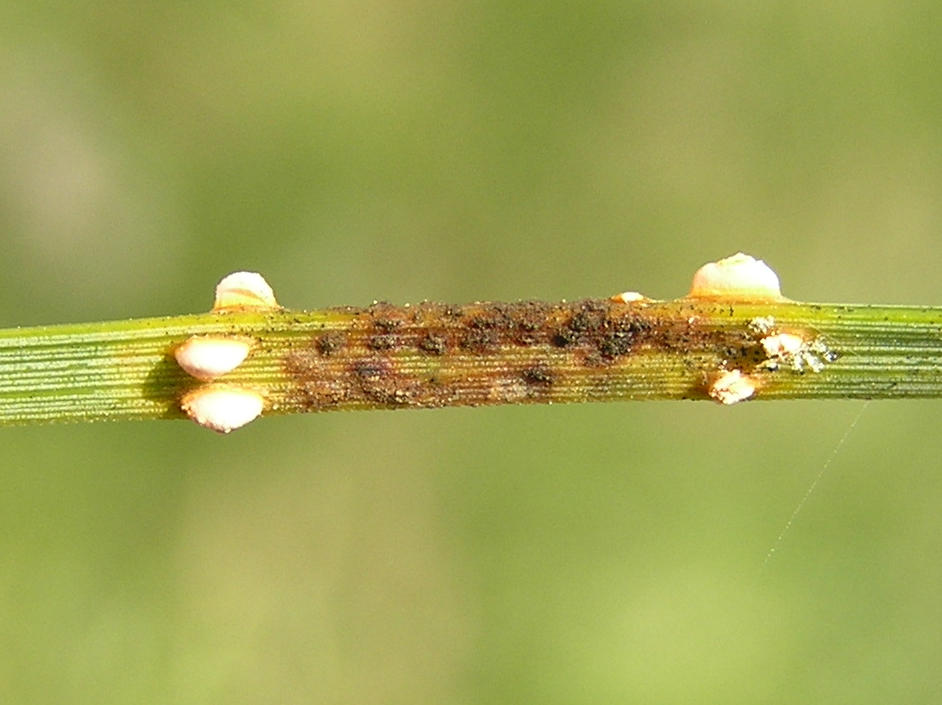

Scientific classification
- Domain: Eukaryota
- Kingdom: Fungi
- Division: Basidiomycota
- Class: Pucciniomycetes
- Order: Pucciniales
- Family: Coleosporiaceae
- Genus: Coleosporium
- Species: C. tussilaginis

Binomial name
- Coleosporium tussilaginis (Pers.) Lév. (1849)

Synonyms
- Aecidium pini sensu auct. (2005); Caeoma campanulae (Pers.) Berk. Caeoma compransor Schltdl., (1824); Caeoma rhinanthacearum (DC.) Berk. Caeoma spinulosum (Pers.) Berk. Coleosporium cacaliae G.H. Otth, (1865); Coleosporium campanulae (Pers.) Lév., (1867); Coleosporium euphrasiae (Schumach.) G. Winter, (1881) [1884] Coleosporium melampyri (Rebent.) P. Karst., (1854); Coleosporium narcissi Grove, J. Bot., (1922); Coleosporium petasitidis (DC.) Thüm., (1876); Coleosporium petasitis de Bary, (1865); Coleosporium rhinanthacearum Lév. Coleosporium sonchi Lév., (1854); Coleosporium sonchi-arvensis (Pers.) Lév., (1860); Coleosporium synantherarum Fr., Summa veg. Scand., (1849); Coleosporium tropaeoli Palm, (1917); Coleosporium tussilaginis f.sp. melampyri Boerema & Verh., (1972); Lindrothia calendulae (McAlpine) Syd., (1922); Peridermium acerifolium (Pers.) Berk. Peridermium pinicola (Pers.) Berk. Peridermium plowrightii Kleb., (1892); Puccinia calendulae McAlpine, (1906); Puccinia sonchi-arvensis Tokun. & Kawai, (1931); Trichobasis cichoracearum sensu auct.; (2005); Trichobasis senecionis sensu auct. p.p.; (2005); Uredo campanulae Pers., (1801); Uredo compransor (Pers.) Berk. Uredo compransor var. petasitis (DC.) Berk. Uredo crustosa (Pers.) Berk. Uredo euphrasiae Schumach., (1803); Uredo melampyri Rebent., (1804); Uredo petasitidis DC., (1805); Uredo rhinanthacearum DC., (1808); Uredo senecionis (Pers.) Berk. Uredo sonchi (Pers.) Berk. Uredo sonchi-arvensis sensu auct. p.p.; (2005); Uredo tremellosa M.J. Decne. Uredo tremellosa var. campanulae F. Strauss, (1810); Uredo tremellosa var. sonchi F. Strauss, (1810); Uredo tropaeoli Desm., (1836); Uredo tussilaginis Pers., (1801)

= Coleosporium tussilaginis =

Species of fungus

Coleosporium tussilaginis is a species of rust fungus in the family Coleosporiaceae. It is a plant pathogen.

It is known to infect Campanula rotundifolia, on which it produces urediniospores and teliospores.
