= Coleosporium ipomoeae =

Scientific classification
- Domain: Eukaryota
- Kingdom: Fungi
- Division: Basidiomycota
- Class: Pucciniomycetes
- Order: Pucciniales
- Family: Coleosporiaceae
- Genus: Coleosporium
- Species: C. ipomoeae

Binomial name
- Coleosporium ipomoeae (Schwein.) Burrill (1885)

Synonyms
- Peridermium ipomoeae Hedgc. (1917); Uredo ipomoeae Schwein. (1963); Uredo ipomoeae Yadav (1963)

Species of fungus

Coleosporium ipomoeae is a plant pathogen. Specifically, it is a fungus that can develop on morning glories.
