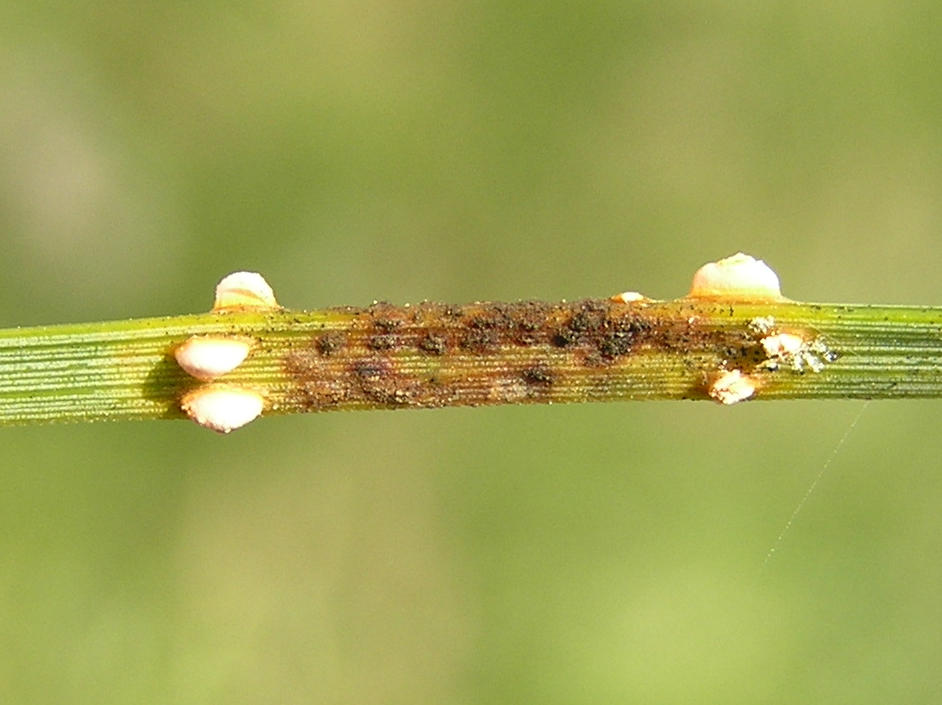
- Coleosporium tussilaginis

Scientific classification
- Kingdom: Fungi
- Division: Basidiomycota
- Class: Pucciniomycetes
- Order: Pucciniales
- Family: Coleosporiaceae
- Genus: Coleosporium; Lév. (1847)

Type species
- Coleosporium tussilaginis (Pers.) Lév. (1849)

Synonyms
- Erannium Bonord. (1860); Stichopsora Dietel (1899); Synomyces Arthur

= Coleosporium =

Genus of fungi

Coleosporium is a genus of rust fungi in the family Coleosporiaceae. The genus contains about 100 species. The aecial stages are parasitic on Pinus spp., and the telial stages on a wide range of angiosperms.

== Selected species ==
- Coleosporium asterum – parasite of Solidago gigantea
- Coleosporium carneum
- Coleosporium clematidis
- Coleosporium clerodendri
- Coleosporium delicatulum
- Coleosporium eupatorii
- Coleosporium helianthi
- Coleosporium ipomoeae
- Coleosporium leptodermidis
- Coleosporium ligulariae
- Coleosporium madiae
- Coleosporium pacificum
- Coleosporium perillae
- Coleosporium plectranthi
- Coleosporium plumeriae
- Coleosporium saussureae
- Coleosporium telekiae
- Coleosporium tussilaginis
- Coleosporium zanthoxyli

== Range ==
Mostly the Northern Hemisphere.
