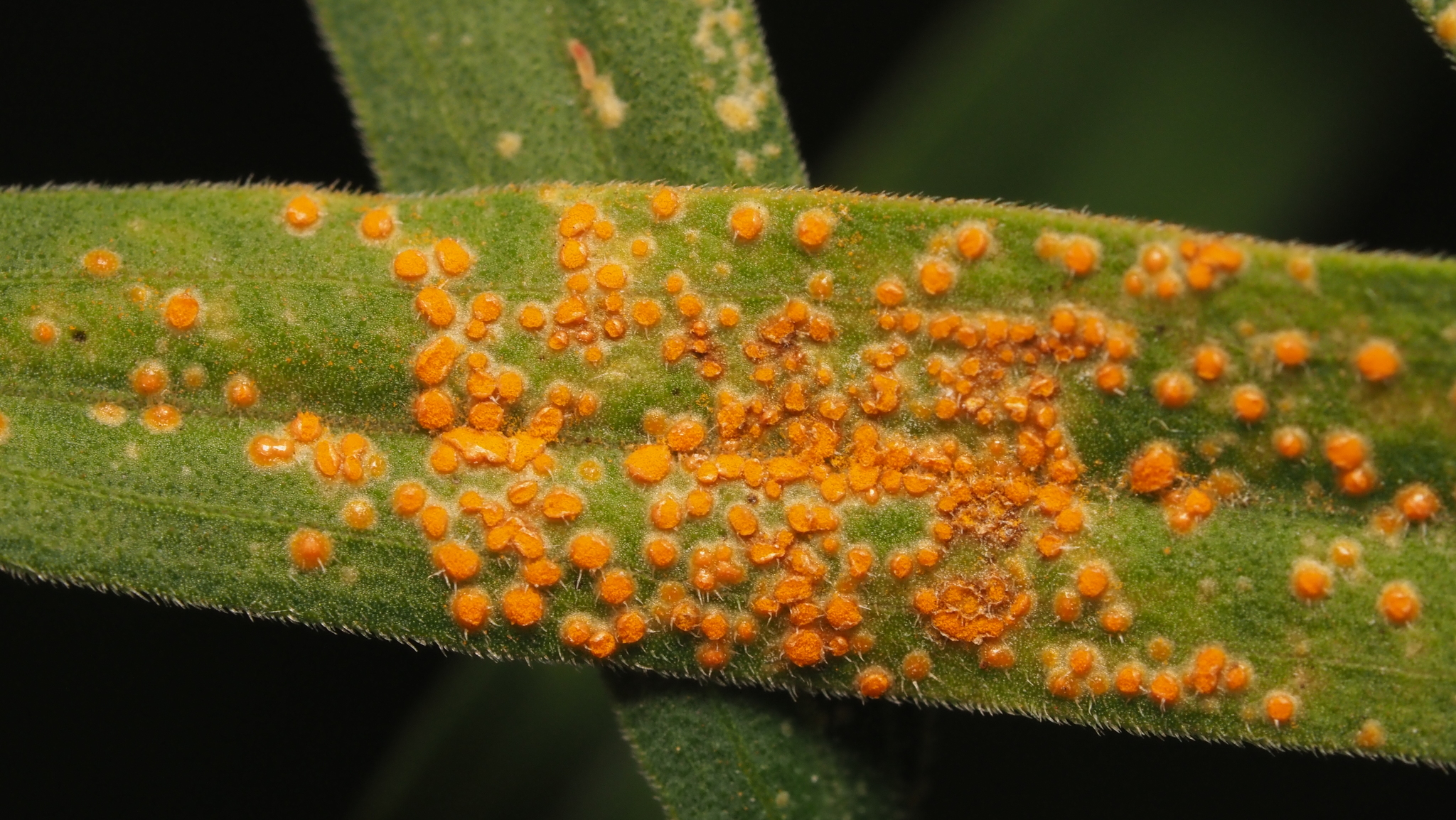
- On a leaf of a plant in family Asteraceae
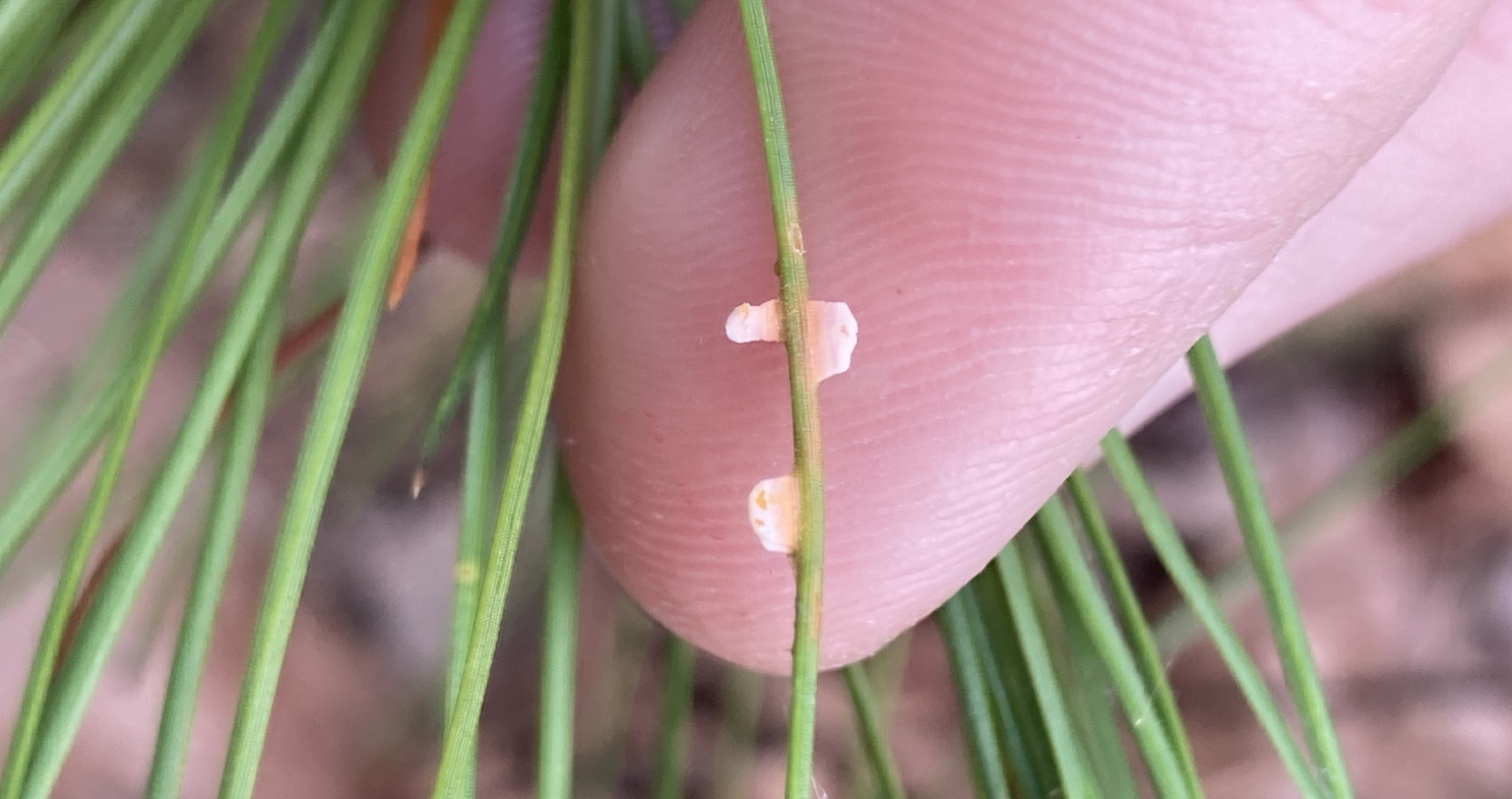
- On a needle of a tree in the genus Pinus

Scientific classification
- Domain: Eukaryota
- Kingdom: Fungi
- Division: Basidiomycota
- Class: Pucciniomycetes
- Order: Pucciniales
- Family: Coleosporiaceae
- Genus: Coleosporium
- Species: C. asterum

Binomial name
- Coleosporium asterum (Dietel) Syd. & P.Syd. (1914)

Synonyms
- Basionym: Stichopsora asterum Dietel (1900); Others: Coleosporium montanum (Arthur & F.Kern) McTaggart & Aime (2018); Coleosporium solidaginis (Schwein.) Thüm. (1878); Peridermium montanum Arthur & F.Kern (1906); Stichopsora solidaginis (Schwein.) Dietel (1903); Uredo solidaginis Schwein. (1822)

= Coleosporium asterum =

Species of fungus

Coleosporium asterum is a species of rust fungus in the family Coleosporiaceae. It infects species in the Asteraceae family, such as those in genus Aster and Solidago, as well as the needle pines Pinus contorta and P. banksiana. It has been recorded on aster family species Canadanthus modestus, Eurybia conspicua, Solidago missouriensis, Symphyotrichum ciliolatum, S. laeve, and numerous others.

The basionym of Coleosporium asterum is Stichopsora asterum, and the fungus originally was found in 1898 on leaves of the Asteraceae species Callistephus chinensis, Aster scaber (now Doellingeria scabra), and Aster tataricus on the island of Honshu, Japan.
