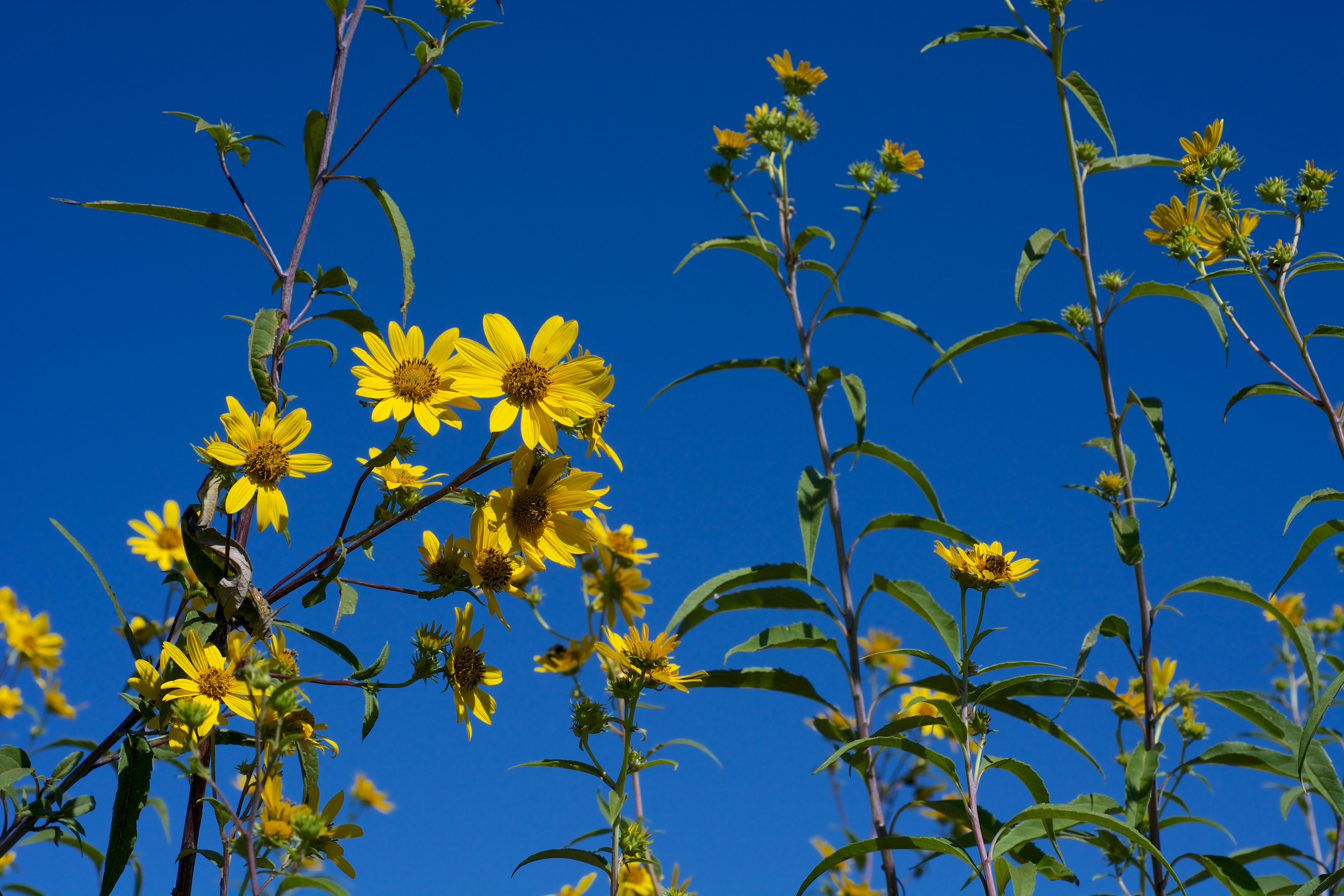

Conservation status
- Least Concern (IUCN 3.1)

Scientific classification
- Kingdom: Plantae
- Clade: Tracheophytes
- Clade: Angiosperms
- Clade: Eudicots
- Clade: Asterids
- Order: Asterales
- Family: Asteraceae
- Tribe: Heliantheae
- Genus: Helianthus
- Species: H. grosseserratus

Binomial name
- Helianthus grosseserratus M.Martens

Synonyms
- Heterotypic Synonyms: Helianthus grosseserratus var. hypoleucus A.Gray; Helianthus grosseserratus subsp. maximus R.W.Long; Helianthus grosseserratus f. pleniflorus Wadmond; Helianthus instabilis E.Watson

= Helianthus grosseserratus =

Species of plant

Helianthus grosseserratus, commonly known as sawtooth sunflower or thick-tooth sunflower, is a perennial sunflower in the family Asteraceae, with a large flowering head (inflorescence).

The plant may reach 3–7 feet (91–366 cm) in height with instances to 12 and is found along streams, damp prairies and roadsides in the eastern and central parts of Canada and the United States, primarily in the northern Great Plains and Great Lakes Region, with additional populations as far as Maine, Georgia, and Texas. It prefers full sun and moist, fertile loamy soil with high organic content.

The lanceolate leaves are glossy, simple and alternate and may reach 4 to 12 inches (10–30 cm) long and from 1 to 4 inches (2–10 cm) wide. The leaves have large teeth along the edges (hence the name, sawtooth) to occasionally nearly entire and the tips are pointed.

The head (formally composite flower) is 3 to 4 inches (7–10 cm) wide with golden-yellow disk flowers that bloom in summer and autumn. The 10-20 yellow ray florets are about 1.5 inches (3.81 cm) long. The fruit is a single achene within a husk.

Various insects, birds and mammals (including cattle) feed on either the plant or its seeds.

Native Americans used to treat burns with a poultice made from the flowers.

== See also ==
- Jerusalem artichoke
