= International Mycological Association =

International learned society for mycology

International Mycological Association (IMA)
- Abbreviation: IMA
- Formation: 1971
- Type: NGO
- Legal status: professional organization
- Purpose: promotes mycology
- Headquarters: Exeter (UK)
- Region served: World
- Members: mycologists worldwide.
- Website: www.ima-mycology.org

The International Mycological Association (IMA) is a professional organization that promotes mycology, the study of fungi. It was founded in 1971 during the first International Mycological Congress, which was held in Exeter (UK).

The IMA publishes the open access scientific journal IMA Fungus.

It represents the interests of over 30,000 mycologists worldwide.

== Awards ==
The society makes several awards for contributions to mycology:

- De Bary Medal to long-established mycologists based on their career achievement
- Ainsworth Medal for services to the world of mycology
- Young Mycologists awards through a series of medals recognising the achievements of young mycologists working in different regions around the world: Ethel Mary Doidge Medal (Africa); Keisuke Tubaki Medal (Asia); Carlos Luis Spegazzini Medal (Latin America); Elias Magnus Fries Medal (Europe); Arthur Henry Reginald Buller Medal (North America); Daniel McAlpine Medal (Australasia)
