= Coleosporium helianthi =

Scientific classification
- Kingdom: Fungi
- Division: Basidiomycota
- Class: Pucciniomycetes
- Order: Pucciniales
- Family: Coleosporiaceae
- Genus: Coleosporium
- Species: C. helianthi

Binomial name
- Coleosporium helianthi Arthur, (1907)

Species of fungus

Coleosporium helianthi is a fungal plant pathogen common in the American South. As its name suggests, it is found as a rust on sunflowers.
