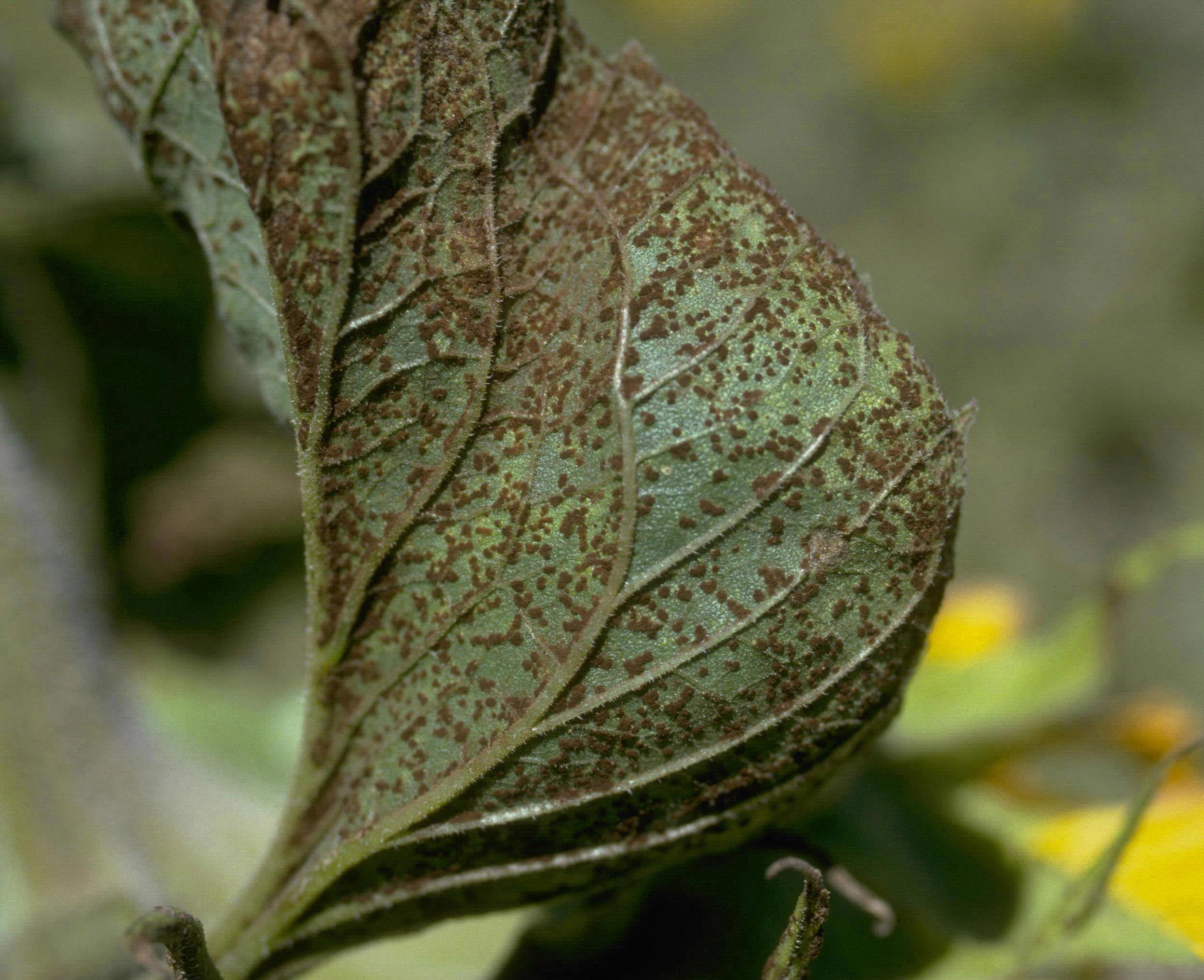

Scientific classification
- Kingdom: Fungi
- Division: Basidiomycota
- Class: Pucciniomycetes
- Order: Pucciniales
- Family: Pucciniaceae
- Genus: Puccinia
- Species: P. helianthi

Binomial name
- Puccinia helianthi Schwein. (1822)

= Puccinia helianthi =

Species of fungus

Puccinia helianthi is a macrocyclic and autoecious fungal plant pathogen that causes rust on sunflower. It is also known as "common rust" and "red rust" of sunflower.

== Other Puccinia spp. on sunflower ==
P. helianthi is the main causal agent of sunflower rust, but four other Puccinia species can also cause rust on cultivated and wild sunflower species. Although they rarely appear, it can be difficult to distinguish them from P. helianthi on sunflower. Both P. enceliae and P. massalis produce uredia and telia that can only be differentiated from those produced by P. helianthi using teliospore morphology. P. xanthii, also known as cocklebur rust, is microcyclic and only forms telia. P. canaliculata, known as nutsedge rust, only produces uredia and telia on its alternate host, nutsedge.

== Favorable environmental conditions ==
When environmental conditions are favorable for disease development, a substantial reduction in sunflower seed quality and yield can occur. These conditions include:

- At least eight hours of free moisture
- Consistent temperatures between 15 and 25 degrees Celsius

== Symptoms ==
P. helianthi produces these symptoms on sunflower:

- Yellow-orange spots on upper leaves surrounded by a chlorotic halo
- Orange-brown spots on the underside of leaves
- Rust spots that may appear dusty on leaves, stems, petioles, and back of the flower head

== Signs ==
The most identifiable sign of P. helianthi is the uredinia which forms rust-colored pustules on leaves, stems, petioles, and bracts. These darken into black, telial resting pustules once temperatures decrease. Flask-shaped pycnia appear as yellow-orange spots, 6mm or less, on the upper side of leaves in early spring. Collections of similarly sized aecia are visible as orange cups directly below on the underside of leaves.

== Life cycle ==
P. helianthi produces five distinct spore stages during its life cycle. The uredinial stage is the repeating stage consisting of uredinia as red-brown, cinnamon-colored pustules containing thousands of urediniospores. During fall, these pustules turn black and begin producing overwintering teliospores in the telial stage. In early spring, the teliospores germinate to produce basidiospores, which disperse to infect sunflower seedlings. These infections elicit the pycnial and aecial spore stages, where flask-shaped pycnia is found embedded in the upper surfaces of leaf tissues, and aecia is seen directly below the pycnia on the dorsal side of leaves. Aeciospores that develop in the aecia reinfect sunflowers and reset the cycle by creating new uredinia.

== Management options ==
Cultural control recommendations for P. helianthi include:

- utilizing crop rotation of sunflowers after infection occurs and eliminating wild and volunteer sunflowers which will reduce the inoculum reservoir
- planting short-lived hybrids or planting earlier in the season
- spacing plants to reduce canopy density and moisture
- avoiding high nitrogen fertilization, as it will increase vegetative growth and humidity.

Genetic control consists of planting rust-resistant hybrid varieties.

Chemical management can be applied using fungicides on both oilseed and confection type sunflowers and is most effective during the (R5) flowering stage or when the disease severity reaches 1% on the upper four, fully expanded leaves.

== See also ==
- List of Puccinia species
