= Coleosporium madiae =

Scientific classification
- Kingdom: Fungi
- Division: Basidiomycota
- Class: Pucciniomycetes
- Order: Pucciniales
- Family: Coleosporiaceae
- Genus: Coleosporium
- Species: C. madiae

Binomial name
- Coleosporium madiae Cooke (1907)

Species of fungus

Coleosporium madiae is a plant pathogen.
