= Plasmopara helianthi f. helianthi =

Scientific classification
- Domain: Eukaryota
- Clade: Sar
- Clade: Stramenopiles
- Phylum: Oomycota
- Class: Peronosporomycetes
- Order: Peronosporales
- Family: Peronosporaceae
- Genus: Plasmopara
- Species: P. helianthi
- Forma: P. h. f. helianthi

Trionomial name
- Plasmopara helianthi f. helianthi Novot.

Plant pathogen that infects sunflowers

Plasmopara helianthi f. helianthi (or "downy mildew of sunflower") is a plant pathogen infecting sunflowers.

== Taxonomy ==
=== Intrageneric Specialization (f. helianthi) ===
According to the European and Mediterranean Plant Protection Organization (EPPO), the intragenus specialized taxon "f.helianthi" was introduced by (Novotel'nova, 1966) in Russia.

The EPO also claims that the taxon "appears to be invalid for regions use outside of Krasnodar area of Russia", according to (Sackston, 1981; Virányi, 1984), and that it remains to be determined whether a specialized fungus as described by (Novotel'nova, 1966) exists in other regions.
