= Alternaria leucanthemi =

Scientific classification
- Kingdom: Fungi
- Division: Ascomycota
- Class: Dothideomycetes
- Order: Pleosporales
- Family: Pleosporaceae
- Genus: Alternaria
- Species: A. leucanthemi

Binomial name
- Alternaria leucanthemi Nelen, (1959)

Species of fungus

Alternaria leucanthemi is a plant pathogen.
