= Coleosporium pacificum =

Scientific classification
- Kingdom: Fungi
- Division: Basidiomycota
- Class: Pucciniomycetes
- Order: Pucciniales
- Family: Coleosporiaceae
- Genus: Coleosporium
- Species: C. pacificum

Binomial name
- Coleosporium pacificum Cummins, (1977)

Species of fungus

Coleosporium pacificum is a fungal plant pathogen common in the Western United States, as a rust on pine needles, marigolds, and sunflowers.
