= Leptosphaeria lindquistii =

Scientific classification
- Kingdom: Fungi
- Division: Ascomycota
- Class: Dothideomycetes
- Order: Pleosporales
- Family: Leptosphaeriaceae
- Genus: Leptosphaeria
- Species: L. lindquistii

Binomial name
- Leptosphaeria lindquistii Frezzi, (1968)

Synonyms
- Phoma macdonaldii Boerema, (1970); Phoma oleracea var. helianthi-tuberosi Sacc.,(1884)

Species of fungus

Phoma macdonaldii (teleomorph: Leptosphaeria lindquistii) is a plant pathogenic fungus that is a major causal force for the disease Phoma Black Stem.

== Host and symptoms ==
=== Host ===
The primary host plant is a sunflower plant (Helianthus annuus L.) – a major oilseed crop. The plant has deep roots that prevent erosion linked damage, making for a highly adaptable crop. Helianthus is a large genus with 51 species, one of the largest plant families on Earth with a genome 3.5 billion letters long. Gene sequencing and current technological methods can be utilized to analyze the genome and potentially select for genes that may confer desirable traits such as disease resistance. To date, sunflower genotypes with partial resistance to P. macdonaldii have been described, but no fully resistant genotypes are available.

Phoma black stem is one of the most common diseases affecting the sunflower plant in North and South America. Phoma Black stem has also been known to occur in regions of Europe and Asia. In most cases, small lesions are produced, however if the infection is caused early on in the season, the sunflower plant may become severely diseased. Phoma black stem typically results in a 10-30% yield loss in the United States. In the case of a more severe infection, which usually occurs if the infection takes root at the beginning of the growing season, smaller heads may be produced, which reduces seed yield and oil percentage to a higher degree.

=== Symptoms ===
Many symptoms caused by the fungal pathogen can be observed post bloom or after flowering. The main identifying symptom is the production of black lesions along the stem which are usually 2 inches in length and 1 inch in height. Lesions are distinguishable from other similar diseases because they form at the petioles of the stem and are black in color. Lesions can also develop on the leaves, flower bracts, back of the head, and crown or base of stalk. Leaf wilting will also be noticeable. Small, fruiting bodies (pycnidia) are produced on the stem. These structures are spore bearing and can be observed with a magnifying or other hand lens on the lesions themselves. Phoma black stem can be distinguished from other diseases due to its black lesions and lack of lodging. The fungus also produces colonies that are gray-white in color and have a white mycelium that may resemble cotton.

== Environment and disease cycle ==
Phoma black stem infections can occur throughout the growing season, although the lesions are more noticeable during late summer. Phoma macdonaldii can be transmitted via rain splash or by stem weevil feeding. The fungus can either penetrate into the plants either directly via enzymatic degradation of the plant cell wall or by mechanical pressure. The fungus overwinters in infected crop debris either inside of pycnidia or as mycelium. Primary inoculum originates from overwintering fungal structures (perithecia, pycnidia, and mycelia). Conidia (from pycnidia) and ascospores (from perithecia) are released from fruiting structures and subsequently dispersed by rain and wind. Disease development is favorable in wet conditions during flowering stage and immediately after flowering stage. Stem weevils transmit the fungus directly by their feeding behaviors.

== Management ==
A supremely effective control measure has not been identified. However, a 4-year rotation to other crops minimizes Phoma fungus in the soil. Late seeding to delay the regular time schedule to adult plant formation has proven successful in reducing disease severity. It's recommended to remove plant debris from the field after harvesting to prevent infections in the following season.

Nitrogen content in soil has been seen to affect pathogen ability to infect. The micro climate resulting from dense canopies, induced by high N fertilization, may have constituted a major climatic parameter in disease epidemiology and successful infection (within sunflower plants).

A 2010 study attempted to identify the most crucial agronomic elements of the sunflower premature ripening disease induced by P. macdonaldii in south-western France. The combination of high nitrogen fertilization and heavy rain conditions resulted in high disease pressure every year. Additionally, differences in susceptibility of sunflower cultivars could be exploited as an additive research venue instead of sole focus developing fungicide protection. Cropping of resistant varieties in combination with appropriate nutrition and other cultural practices could reduce inoculum pressure and pre mature ripening. Promising cultivars should therefore be screened at high N supplies and under water-limited conditions, a procedure which could be used in resistance tests.

== Importance ==
The resulting symptoms of Phoma black stem are again stunted plants with thin stems, smaller heads, blackened pith. Yield losses of 30% may occur in Europe and up to 70% losses have been reported in USA.

In China, the first case was reported in Xinjiang in 2008 - it was believed to be introduced as a result of hybrid sunflower seeds being imported from abroad. The Chinese government included this fungus into its quarantine pathogen list in 2010. During 2010 and 2011 growing seasons, surveys were conducted in 37 commercial farms in five areas (Xinjiang, Inner Mongolia, Ningxia, Hebei, and Beijing). A total of 185 suspicious samples of sunflower black stem disease were collected and all were found from imported hybrid seed fields. The presence of P. macdonaldii was confirmed with pathogenic tests.

== Pathogenesis ==
In regards to host - pathogen interactions: to date, no genotypes (of sunflower plant) have been identified to be completely resistant but some lines are more resistant than others. The inheritance of sunflower resistance to Phoma black stem was reported to be quantitative under additive and dominant effects. It has been recognized that significant differences in pathogenicity exist among different Phoma macdonaldii isolates on the same genetic material. In one study, part of the partial resistance in partially compatible interactions was shown to have a possible association with the expression of genes encoding PAL2 and a thaumatin-like protein, which showed significantly different expression levels between compatible and partially compatible interactions in both sunflower lines contaminated with Phoma macdonaldii isolates.

== Photographs ==
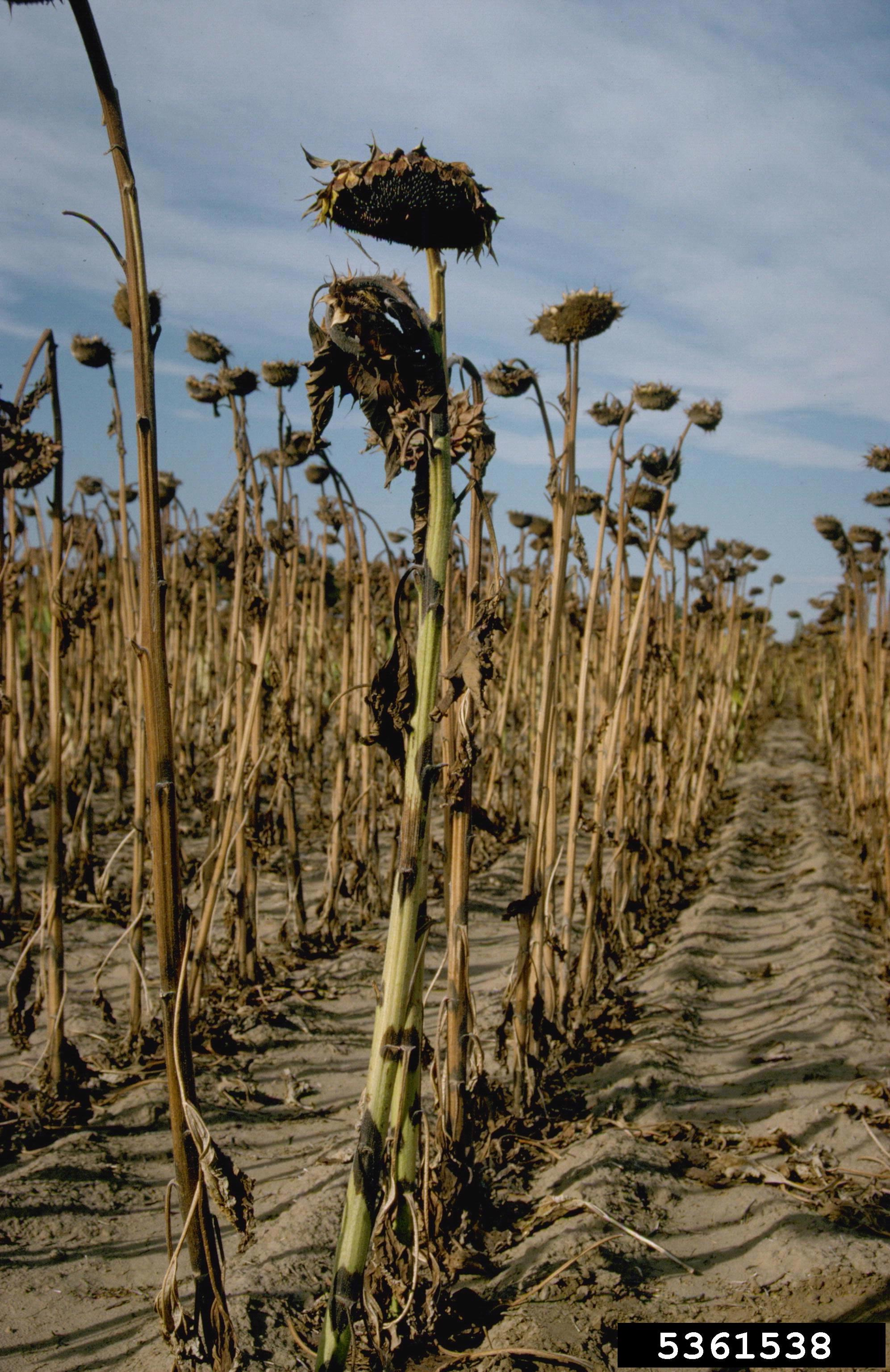

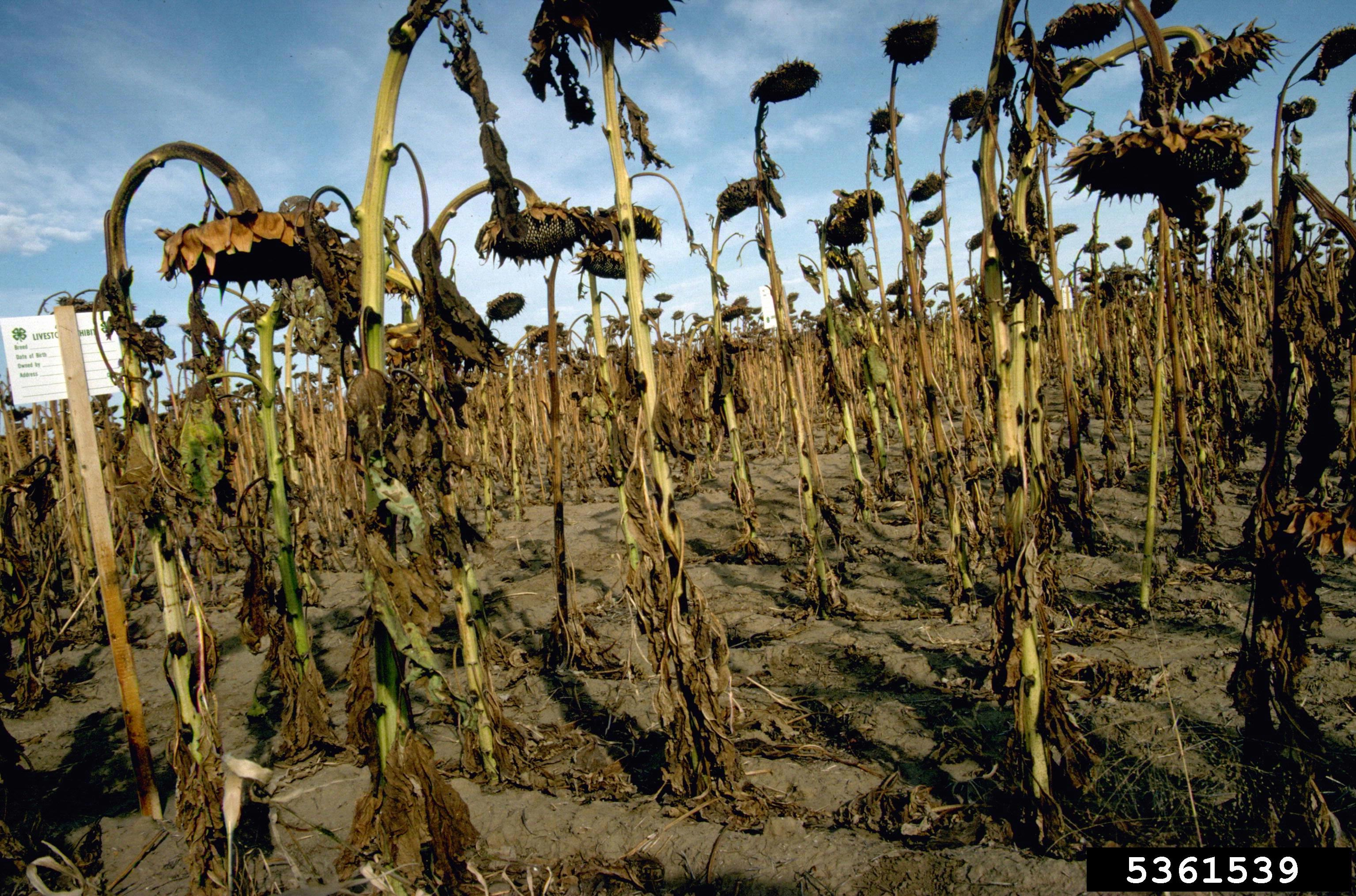

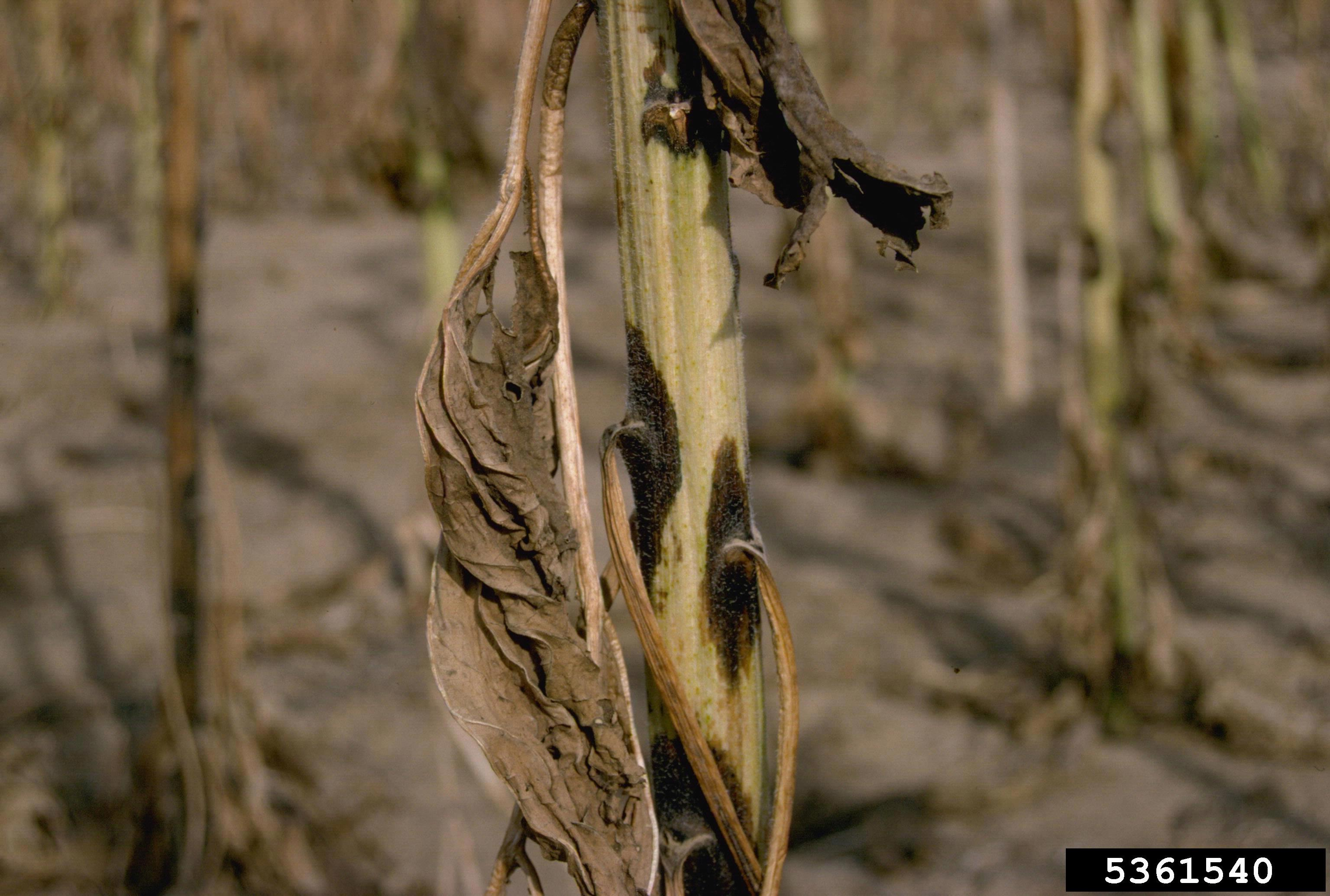
