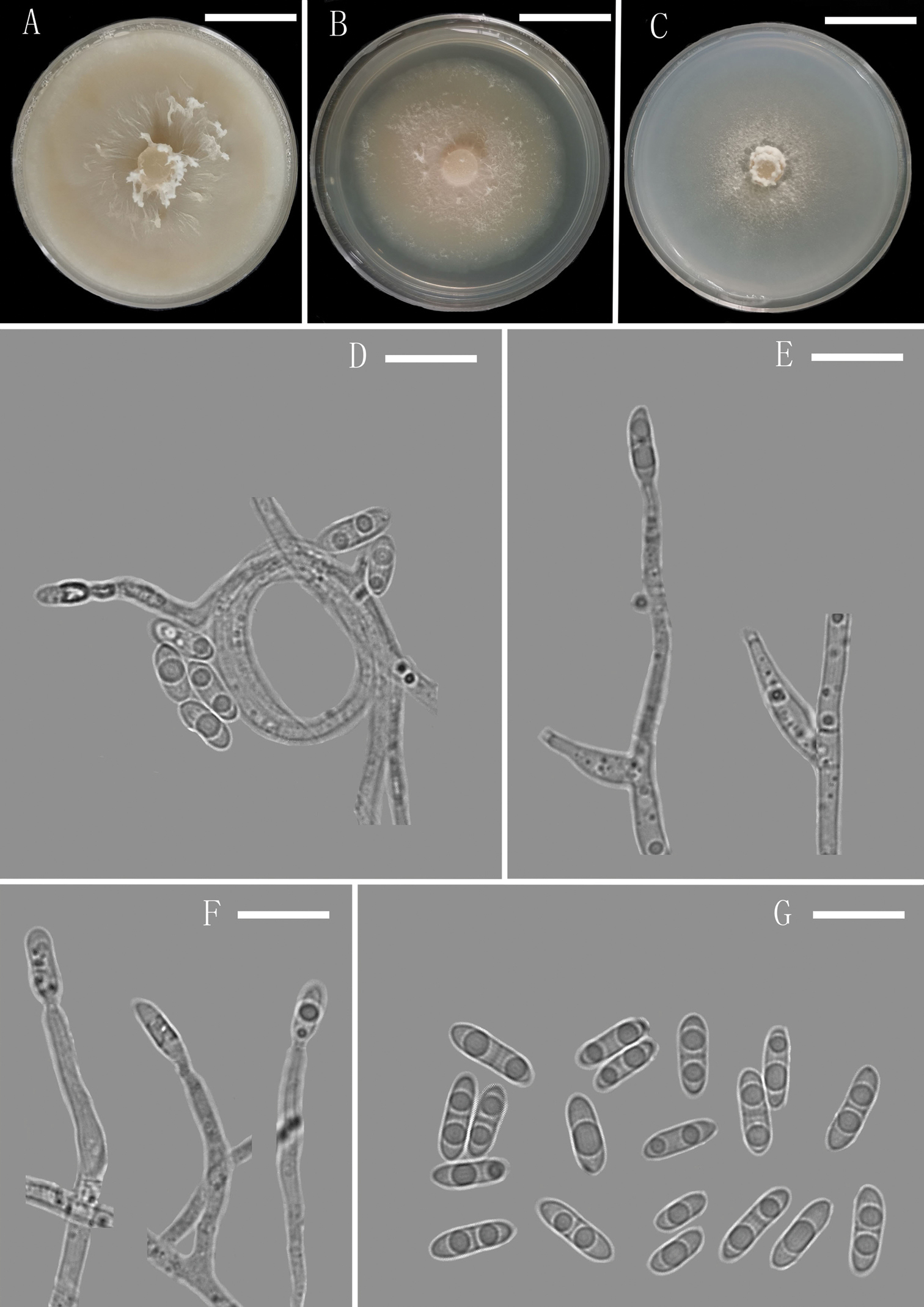
- A–C colony on OA, PDA and CMA after 14 d D hyphal coils E, F conidiophores and Phialides G conidia. Scale bars: 1.35 cm (A–C), 10 µm (D–G)

Scientific classification
- Kingdom: Fungi
- Division: Ascomycota
- Class: Sordariomycetes
- Order: Amphisphaeriales
- Family: Amphisphaeriaceae
- Genus: Monographella
- Species: M. cucumerina

Binomial name
- Monographella cucumerina (Lindf.) Arx, (1984)

Synonyms
- Cephalosporiopsis imperfecta Moreau, (1941); Cephalosporium ciferrii Verona, (1939); Cephalosporium tabacinum J.F.H. Beyma, (1933); Fusarium tabacinum (J.F.H. Beyma) W. Gams, (1968); Microdochium tabacinum (J.F.H. Beyma) Arx, (1984); Micronectriella cucumeris (Kleb.) C. Booth, (1971); Plectosphaerella cucumerina (Lindf.) W. Gams, (1972); Plectosphaerella cucumeris Kleb., (1929); Plectosporium tabacinum (J.F.H. Beyma) M.E. Palm, W. Gams & Nirenberg, (1995); Venturia cucumerina Lindf., (1919)

= Monographella cucumerina =

Monographella cucumerina Gamba nera del basilico

Species of fungus

Monographella cucumerina is a fungal plant pathogen. According to Species Fungorum, its current name is Plectosphaerella cucumerina.
