= Keisuke Tubaki =

Japanese mycologist

- Born: June 21, 1924; Ōmori-ku
- Died: August 18, 2005 (aged 81); Setagaya, Tokyo
- Scientific career
- Fields: Mycology
- Thesis: Studies on the Japanese Hyphomycetes (1959)
- Author abbrev. (botany): Tubaki

Keisuke Tubaki was a Japanese mycologist.

== Early life and education ==
Tubaki studied for his first degree at the Tokyo University of Agriculture, graduating in 1948. He was awarded a doctorate from Hiroshima University in 1959 for his research on Hyphomycetes.

== Career ==
He was employed at the Nagao Institute from 1948. From 1961 he worked at the Institute for Fermentation in Osaka, rising to be the deputy director in 1974. In 1976 he became a professor at the new University of Tsukuba. He retired in 1988, but then started teaching at Nihon University until 1994. He also held a visiting professorship at Tokyo University of Agriculture until 1995. He was an emeritus professor of the University of Tsukuba after his retirement and continued his involvement in mycological research.

Tubaki was particularly interested in the presence and biological activities of fungi in the environment. The breadth of these interests ranged from fungal surveys including identification of novel species, enzyme production by fungi in the environment to collaborations to identify novel metabolites of fungi that parasitised other fungi.

His studies of fungal taxonomy included ways to improve identification methods. In the early 1960s he was involved in development of the Hughes–Tubaki–Barron System for classification of anamorphic fungi that was in use from 1968 onwards, in collaboration with Stanley Hughes and G.L. Barron. This was based on the mechanism of conidial development, viewed using light and electron microscopy, rather than relying on the final form of the conidia alone. This was a step in improving understanding of the fungal species that do not undertake sexual reproduction and is still of practical value in fungal identification. He made a particular study of Hyphomycetes. As molecular methods began to be applied to fungal systematics, Tubaki became involved in projects that used this methodology to study fungal phylogenetic relationships.

== Publications ==
Tubaki was the author or co-author of over 60 scientific publications.

== Honours and awards ==
Tubaki was president of the Mycological Society of Japan from 1985 until 1987. The International Mycological Association named the Keisuke Tubaki Medal after him, awarded for achievement by an Early Career Researcher based in Asia. In 1993 he was awarded the 3rd Minakata Kumagusu Award from Tanabe City and the Minakata Kumagusu Preservation Society for his lifetime mycological achievements.
