= Alternaria helianthi =

Scientific classification
- Kingdom: Fungi
- Division: Ascomycota
- Class: Dothideomycetes
- Order: Pleosporales
- Family: Pleosporaceae
- Genus: Alternaria
- Species: A. helianthi

Binomial name
- Alternaria helianthi (Hansf.) Tubaki & Nishih., (1969)

Synonyms
- Helminthosporium helianthi Hansf.,(1943); Helminthosporium helianthi Pavgi, (1964)

Species of fungus

Alternaria helianthi is a fungal plant pathogen causing a disease in sunflowers known as Alternaria blight of sunflower.

== As a pathogen ==
Alternaria spp. plant pathogens are found across the world, affecting a variety of species, including sunflowers. It is a major defoliating pathogen in warm humid climates like India and Africa. Farmers and businesses produce sunflowers (Helianthus spp.) for manufacturing oil, edible seeds, and ornamental flowers displays. There are a couple of diseases that threaten the production of sunflowers.

Leaf blight of sunflowers is one of the most devastating diseases for sunflowers and is caused by Alternaria helianthi (Hansford) Tubaki and Nishihara, a seed-borne pathogenic fungus. It was recorded in Japan and was the same as a fungus collected earlier on sunflower in Argentina, India, Tanzania, Uganda and Zambia. Transportation of infected sunflowers and agricultural practices spread the pathogen worldwide and cause disasters in places, like India, where sunflowers are a main source of oil production. The pathogen that causes this disease is part of the Alternaria genus, it is ubiquitous and abundant and can cause a high mycotoxicological risk during harvest, which causes devastation to entire crop production.

Alternaria helianthi is an ascomycete from the Pleosporaceae family. This pathogen produces simple, meaning rarely branched conidiophores, that bear solitary conidia. These conidia are light brown colored, ellipsoid or broadly ovoid, and rarely form longitudinal septa.

== Host(s) and symptoms ==
There are eight different species that cause yield loss of sunflowers; however, Alternaria helianthi is the primary causal agent and most widespread. The main hosts are sunflowers (Helianthus annuus); however, it has been proven that safflower (Carthamus tinctorius), noogoora burr (Xanthium pungens), cocklebur (Xanthium strumarium), and Bathurst burr (Xanthium spinosum) can serve as alternative hosts for the pathogen.

=== Symptoms ===
Leaf spots start as small, dark, and angular that eventually turn into necrotic areas that result in defoliation. Defoliation is most prevalent starting at lower leaves, where the microclimate is most favorable. Dark brown lesions are found on leaves, stems, petioles, and bracts. Stem lesions are normally narrow (1-3mm) black streaks that get up to 3 cm long. The pathogen may cause linear spots on stems and water-soaked, sunken lesions on the back of the sunflower head. Some spots could have yellow halo around the spots. Infection causes destruction of the flowers and early senescence.

== Disease cycle ==
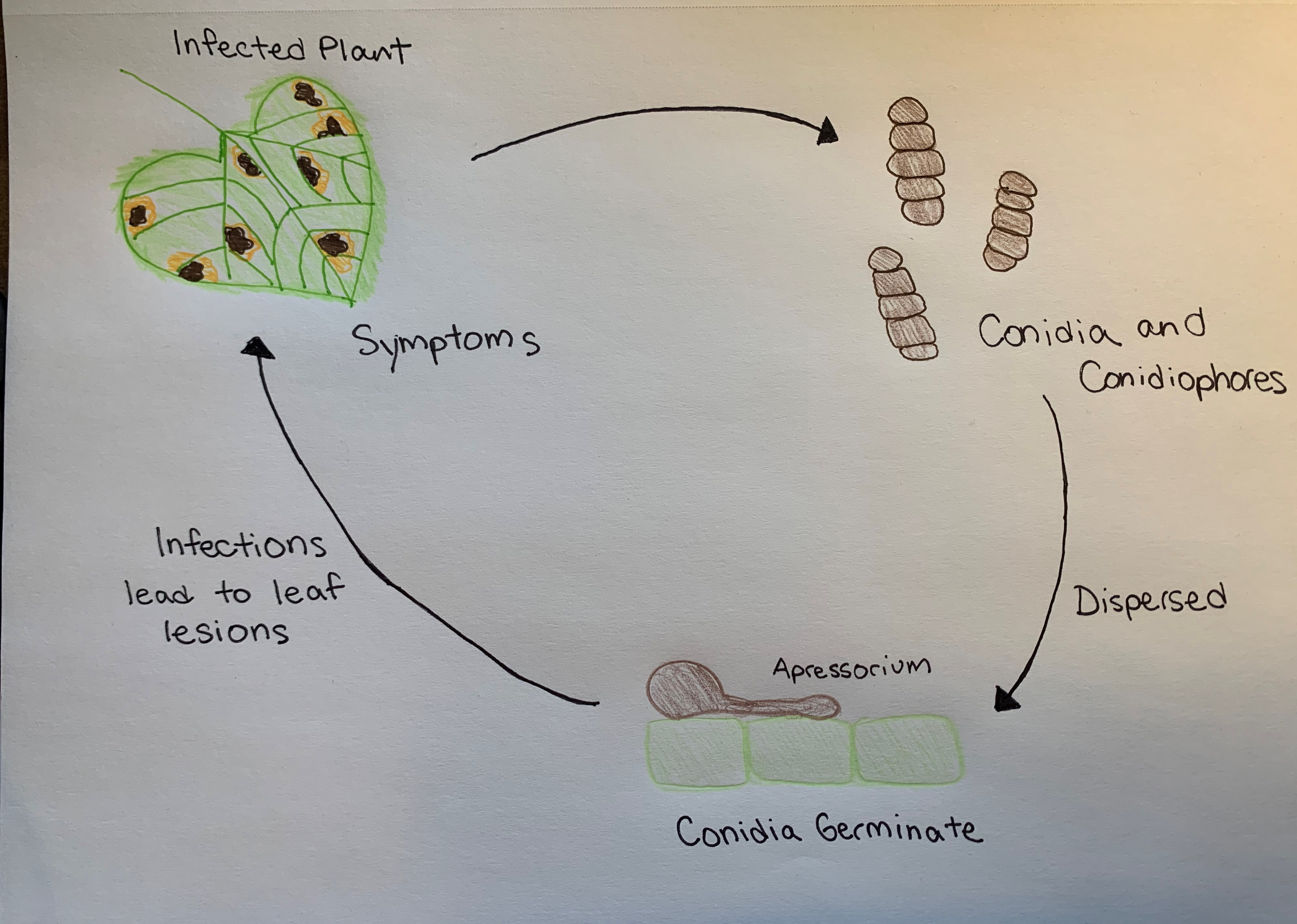
Simple visual description of the Alternaria helianthi disease cycle

This pathogen overwinters on infected plant residues, but wild sunflowers may also serve as reservoirs. All species, including Alternaria helianthi, may also be seedborne. Alternaria spp. have no sexual or perfect stage. They multiply asexually through the method of sporulation. By producing one or more germ tubes, the conidia are germinated. Disease progression heavily relies on the duration of leaf wetness following initial infection, as the germination of new spores can occur within days. Germination occurs best at temperatures less than 26 degrees C and require a minimum of 4 hours of leaf wetness for sporulation. The pathogen is dispersed and spread via windblown or water-splashed onto lower leaves of the sunflower. Young seedlings are more susceptible, but lower leaves on mature plants frequently are defoliated by Alternaria spp..

Germ tubes are produced by the conidia and grow across the leaf surface before forming an appressorium. The fungus will then enter the host by penetrating through the cuticle and epidermis. It has also been observed that penetration through wounds and stomates can occur. The conidiophores then develop through the collapsed stomates. Conidiophores are 12 to 50 micrometers long and rise singly or in branches. The conidia will emerge through the stomata and trichomes. At this stage, the conidia produced will cause secondary infection and spread to other healthy plants. Under certain conditions, micro-cyclic conidia can be produced directly from the parent conidia.

== Management ==
There are three main types of control for Alternaria helianthi: cultural practices, fungicides, and resistance. Cultural practices include removing wild and volunteer sunflower hosts, minimizing dampness/wetness of leaves, and removal of previous sunflower residues found in the soil. The destruction of the plant residue will eliminate the source of inoculum. Additionally, crop rotation with non-Asteraceae crops or allowing for fallow periods can assist in management. There is an option for seed treatments; however, the use of multiple applications of different fungicides are more effective. Finally, oilseed sunflowers have been found with disease resistance, so there could be a possibility of hybrid sunflowers incorporating the resistance into other sunflower species.
