= Puccinia xanthii =

Scientific classification
- Kingdom: Fungi
- Division: Basidiomycota
- Class: Pucciniomycetes
- Order: Pucciniales
- Family: Pucciniaceae
- Genus: Puccinia
- Species: P. xanthii

Binomial name
- Puccinia xanthii Schwein. (1822)

Species of fungus

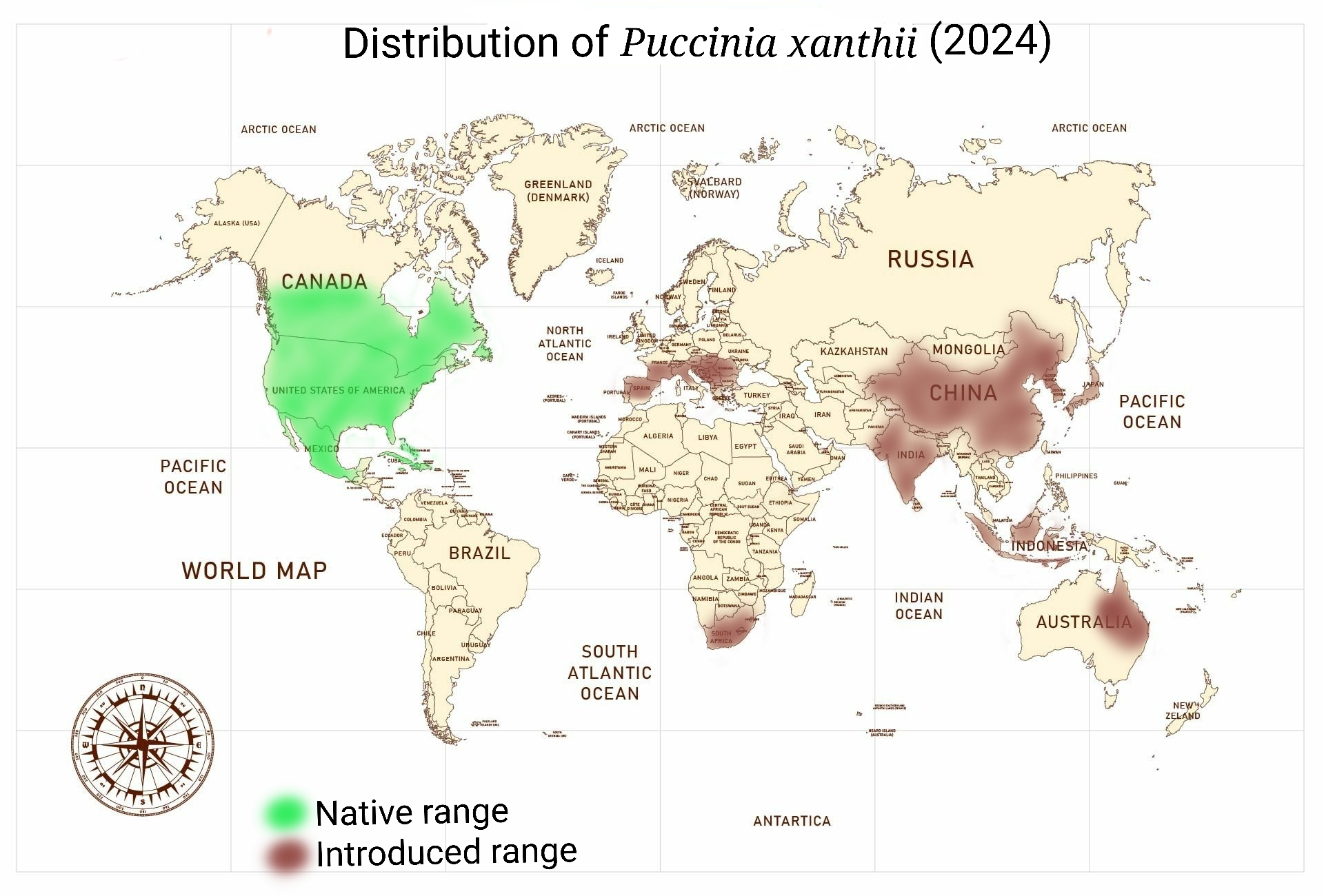
Distribution of Puccinia xanthii as of 2024.

Puccinia xanthii is a fungal pathogen of plants in the Asteraceae, and can infect hosts from at least 42 genera within that family, most notably species in the Xanthium and Ambrosia genera. This pathogen was discovered growing on Xanthium strumarium in North Carolina, United States in 1822. Common names of P. xanthii include Summer Rust and Cocklebur Rust.

== Distribution ==
Puccinia xanthii is native to the continental United States, Canada, Mexico, Hawaii, Cuba, Haiti, the Dominican Republic, Puerto Rico, and the Bahamas. This fungus has been reported in several countries throughout Europe, Asia, Africa and Australia; often following the introduction of invasive host plants from North America or intentional release as a biocontrol agent.

=== Europe ===
Researchers have detected P. xanthii in Bulgaria, southern France, Hungary, northern Italy, Romania, Spain, and the former Yugoslavia (Bosnia, Serbia, Slovenia, Montenegro, Macedonia, Herzegovina, and Croatia). Puccinia xanthii was found growing on Xanthium orientale subsp. italicum in eastern Hungary in December 2002.

=== Asia ===
Puccinia xanthii has been detected in India, Indonesia, Japan, Pakistan, and Korea. Puccinia xanthii was found growing in lesions on leaves of Xanthium orientale in Okcheon-gun, Korea in October 2021 and from Xanthium orientale subsp. italicum in the Liaoning Province of China in August 2013. Xanthium orientale subsp. italicum was first found in Beijing, China in 1991 and has been shown to decrease the biodiversity of native flora and cause human health hazards from allergenic pollen. As a result of this, the P. xanthii is considered beneficial in this area as it may decrease the vigor of this weed. Puccinia xanthii was also found on Xanthium strumarium in Parachinar, Pakistan in 2018.

=== Australia ===
Puccinia xanthii was observed on Xanthium occidentale in Australia in 1975.

=== Africa ===
Puccinia xanthii was found growing on Helianthus annous in the Northwest Province of South Africa in February 2000.

== Taxonomy ==
Puccinia xanthii is a rust in the phylum Basidiomycota, subphylum Pucciniomycotina, class Pucciniomycetes, order Pucciniales, and family Pucciniaceae. Its full scientific name is Puccinia xanthii Schwein., Schriften der Naturforschenden Gesellschaft zu Leipzig 1:73. Using data from ITS (internal transcribed spacer) and TEF (translation elongation factor) phylogenetic analyses, the closest relative of P. xanthii is P. melampodii, and these species are a sister group to the fungus Dietelia portoricensis. In 2005, Hennen et al. proposed that P. xanthii, P. melampodii, and 51 other microcyclic rusts from the Americas and Eurasia that infect members of the Asteraceae should be grouped under the single morphospecies name Puccinia cnici-oleracei. This complex is based on morphology and needs further proof to be considered valid, however, P. xanthii and P. melampodii could not be easily separated at the species level using phylogenetic data from the ITS and TEF regions.

This fungus has a high level of intraspecies variation, resulting in many different strains that specialize on one or a few hosts in the Asteraceae. Studies on the pathogenicity of Puccinia xanthii vary considerably based on where the isolate (which cannot be grown in culture) was taken. This high level of genetic variation is created through sexual recombination during karyogamy, somatic hybridization, mutations, and genes introduced from closely related species or other strains of P. xanthii. For example, an Australian strain of P. xanthii was able to infect Calendula offinalis and some cultivars of Helianthus annus while an American strain was able to infect only Ambrosia trifida in cross inoculation tests. Index Fungorum recognizes three classifications of P. xanthii below the species level: Puccinia xanthii var. ambrosiae-trifidae, Puccinia xanthii var. parthenii-hysterophorae, and Puccinia xanthii var. xanthii. This pathogen requires more study as the number of reported host species of Puccinia xanthii comprises more species than those infected by these subclassifications.

=== Puccinia xanthii var. ambrosiae-trifidae ===
This is an obligate pathogen of Ambrosia trifida, commonly known as the giant ragweed. Studies in the Liaoning Province of China show that P. xanthii var. ambrosiae-trifidae is a suitable biocontrol for this plant, which is highly allergenic and invasive throughout Asia, Europe, and Australia. There is controversy over whether P. xanthii var. ambrosiae-trifidae is considered a forma specialis, as it was originally named in 1981, or a variety. Genetic evidence considering the degree or similarity between P. xanthii morphospecies suggests that the term variety is more accurate to distinguish between populations of P. xanthii, but literature varies in the use of f. sp. or var.

=== Puccinia xanthii var. parthenii-hysterophorae ===
This variation is native to Mexico and specializes in infecting the plant Parthenium hysterophorus. Outside of its native range, this North American weed has caused issues in agriculture via allopathic chemicals, decreased biodiversity, and its pollen is a human health hazard. P. xanthii var. parthenii-hysterophorae has been intentionally introduced to north and central Queensland, Australia in 2000 as a biocontrol for this invasive plant. It was also introduced in South Africa as a biocontrol in 2010 as part of an effort to contain this weed from spreading through sub-Saharan Africa.

=== Puccinia xanthii var. xanthii ===
This variation specializes on plants in the Xanthium genus.

== Synonyms ==
Leptopuccinia xanthii

Micropuccinia xanthii

Dasyspora xanthii

== Disease Cycle ==
Puccinia xanthii is a microcyclic, autoecious obligate biotroph. This means that it only produces basidiospores and teliospores (and lacks spermatia, aeciospores, and urediniospores) and completes its life cycle on a single living host plant. Due to the cyclic nature of rusts, this lifecycle doesn't have a "start" point. In this case, a basidiospore landing on a leaf is arbitrarily chosen to begin the life cycle.

Basidiospores of P. xanthii are carried to new plants via wind or through physical contact with nearby plants. These basidiospores germinate a polar, or occasionally lateral, germ tube that can be thin or thick. Thicker germ tubes often lead to the formation of a non-sequential basidiospore, or a smaller, secondary basidiospore that forms from the germ tube of the original. Thicker germ tubes can also lead to chains of basidiospores, which is most common in P. xanthii f. sp. ambrosiae-trifidae and functions as a form of asexual reproduction. Germ tubes are highly variable in length, and have a roughly equal chance of being 0.5-1.5 μm or 5-10 μm long. In 3% of cases, germ tubes are several times the length of the basidiospore.

At the end of the germ tube, an appressorium (specialized structure used to attach to and penetrate the leaf surface) is formed. Puccinia xanthii has been shown to produce its appressoria preferentially along the cellular gaps of the leaf epidermis. The appressoria is attached to the leaf with a mucilaginous exudate that helps protect it from desiccation and may also provide a reservoir of enzymes to help penetrate the host epidermis. This structure ranges in form from a swollen bump to a well defined lobing at the end of the germ tube. Underneath the appressorium, numerous wedge-shaped papillae and a penetration peg are formed. The penetration peg goes directly through the epidermis. While splitting the cuticle wall, the penetration peg is quite thin then expands when it reaches the cell membrane. The penetration peg continues growing and forms intraepidermal vesicles to contain the remaining contents of the basidiospore before putting down a septum and differentiating into primary hyphae.

The hyphae colonizes the plant tissue as it grows and branches into neighboring epidermal cells, intercellular space, and finally into the spongy parenchyma cells. During this colonization, the hyphae forms haustoria 24 to 48 hours after inoculation. The haustoria of P. xanthii look like swellings of the hyphae (lacking morphological specialization seen in haustoria with projections) that grow inside plant cells and absorb nutrients and water.

Puccinia xanthii will form dark brown telia in a thallus that erupts through the leaf surface seven to eight days after inoculation. Telia are 0.28-0.61 mm in diameter, round, and mostly form in circular groups 10 mm in diameter on the lower leaf surface (though telia can be found on either side of the leaf). These telia will bore teliospores that can either germinate immediately if conditions are favorable or act as a survival structure for the fungus. The teliospores are darker or lighter yellowish-brown, smooth, 42-58 μm x 12-21 μm and thicker near the conical apex. They are two-celled and have a constricted septum. Teliospores also have a persistent yellowish-brown pedicel that is 22-70 μm long. The teliospores will germinate to form a tube-shaped basidium with three septations. This basidium then forms four white, thin-walled, binucleate, single-celled basidiospores. The basidiospores are binucleate due to a mitotic division of the initial nucleus while the infective mycelium is monokaryotic. These basidiospores break off of the basidium (usually attached to the teliospore and telia) and continue the infection cycle.

== Signs and symptoms ==
Puccinia xanthii forms dark brown pustules (raised spots) with a chlorotic halo on the adaxial, and sometimes abaxial leaf surface. In the early stage of infection, P. xanthii causes yellow lesions that gradually turn brown in the center as telia are produced. Multiple infections cause necrotic lesions that can cover leaves, petioles, and stems. Depending on the susceptibility of the host and severity of the infection, P. xanthii can cause plant decline and death.

== Application as a Biocontrol ==
For information on where this species is being used as a biocontrol, please refer to the section on distribution. There are mixed results on the use of P. xanthii as a biocontrol, while it can cause significant damage on some host plants, it requires suitable environmental conditions to hinder plant growth. For example, while P. xanthii was able to infect and kill invasive cocklebur species in Hungary if infection starts when the plant is a cotyledon, natural infections that begin during the second part of the growing season and are seldom lethal.

The Australian Department of Agriculture, Water and the Environment has put out an extension document on using P. xanthii var. parthenii-hysterophorae as a biocontrol agent. They advocate for people to intentionally spread summer rust onto invasive Parthenium spp. by collecting symptomatic leaves and pinning them to uninfected plants. This strategy has been used in Australia to contain the spread of Parthenium. Kassai-Jager et al. has also recommended the use of this pathogen as a classical biocontrol agent in Australia against another invasive member of the Asteraceae from North America, Ambrosia artemisifolia. Puccinia xanthii from Ambrosia artemisifolia growing in the wild in Texas was "highly virulent on A. artemisifolia plants from Australia".

Natural infections of Puccinia xanthii var. ambrosia-trifidae on Ambrosia trifida in Maryland caused severe decline on A. trifida and reduced its propagative potential. Batra performed pathogenicity tests on this variation and recommended using P. xanthii var. ambrosia-trifidae as a biocontrol in Eurasia where this plant is an invasive species.

== Pathogenicity on Sunflowers ==
Puccinia xanthii may also pose a potential threat to the ornamental plant trade. Puccinia xanthii could infect and cause foliar damage to Helianthus annus and Calendula offiinalis in pathogenicity tests using strains from C. officinalis in Queensland. This is likely an undescribed variety of P. xanthii. More taxonomic research is needed to distinguish between the varieties of P. xanthii by host-pathogen interaction.

== See also ==
- List of Puccinia species
