= Golovinomyces latisporus =

Scientific classification
- Kingdom: Fungi
- Division: Ascomycota
- Class: Leotiomycetes
- Order: Helotiales
- Family: Erysiphaceae
- Genus: Golovinomyces
- Species: G. latisporus

Binomial name
- Golovinomyces latisporus (U. Braun) P.L. Qiu & Shu Y. Liu, 2020

Synonyms
- Erysiphe cichoracearum var. latispora U. Braun, 1983; Oidium latisporum U. Braun, 1982

Species of fungus

Golovinomyces latisporus is a fungal plant pathogen in the family Erysiphaceae (powdery mildews). Part of the Golovinomyces ambrosiae complex, this species infects sunflowers (Helianthus, and likely Heliopsis too).

== Taxonomy ==
Golovinomyces latisporus was first described by Uwe Braun in 1983 with the basionym Erysiphe cichoracearum var. latispora. The variety was later raised to species level by Peng-Lei Qiu et al. in 2020.
