= Little sunflower =

Little sunflower or Little Sunflower may refer to:

- Helianthella, genus of plants commonly called little sunflowers
- Helianthus pumilus, species of plant commonly called little sunflower
- Little Sunflower, a jazz standard by Freddie Hubbard from the album Backlash
