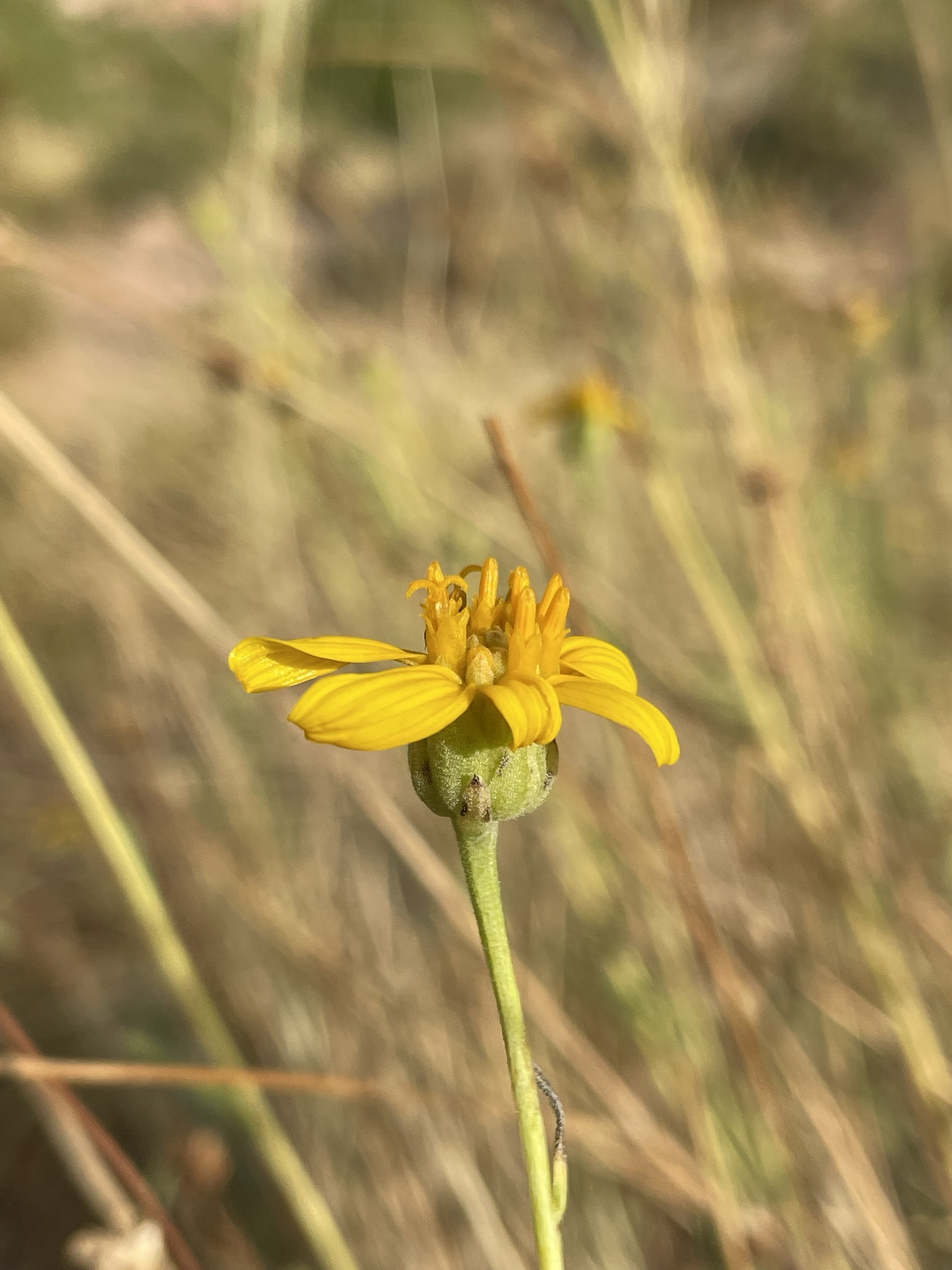
- Side view of the flower

Conservation status
- Critically Imperiled (NatureServe)

Scientific classification
- Kingdom: Plantae
- Clade: Embryophytes
- Clade: Tracheophytes
- Clade: Angiosperms
- Clade: Eudicots
- Clade: Asterids
- Order: Asterales
- Family: Asteraceae
- Tribe: Heliantheae
- Genus: Helianthus
- Species: H. devernii

Binomial name
- Helianthus devernii T.M.Draper

= Helianthus devernii =

Species of flowering plant

Helianthus devernii is a North American species of flowering plant in the daisy family Asteraceae, known by the common name Red Rock sunflower. The perennial herbaceous plant is endemic to a portion of Nevada's Red Rock Canyon National Conservation Area measuring less than 1 acre (4,000 m^{2}), where it grows in just two desert spring locations within the Mojave Desert.

The plant reaches up to 102 cm (40 in) in height. Its leaves tend toward the grass-like shape, with a single prominent vein, and alternate up the stem. The flower heads feature 5-8 yellow apparent petals—ray florets—surrounding a larger number of disk florets; the seeds are 3.5–4.0 mm (0.14–0.16 in) long. H. devernii can be distinguished from the closely related Helianthus cusickii by its shorter ray petals and single-veined leaves, and genetic evidence indicates it is most closely related to Helianthus pumilus. With a total known population of 725 individuals in a very small area of distribution that is also subject to a variety of threats, the species is considered critically imperiled. Conservation efforts are underway as of 2024.

== Description ==
Helianthus devernii is a herbaceous plant with a perennial habit that regrows each year from an underground branched woody structure atop its roots. The stems reach as much as 102 cm (40 in) in height and lack hairs but have a waxy coating making the surface somewhat whitish. Bone white stems from previous years are persistent and intermingle with the present year's stems.

The leaves are attached to the stems directly without a short leaf stem. Each leaf has one prominent vein or nerve, though lower leaves may have two additional indistinct veins. Leaf edges do not have teeth and the lower leaves are attached in pairs on opposite sides of the stems. The leaves nearer the midpoint of the stems are largest measuring 6.8–10.3 cm (2.7–4.1 in) long and usually just 2.8–7.6 mm (0.11–0.30 in) but occasionally as much as 10.3 mm (0.41 in) wide. They have a very narrow, almost grass-like leaf shape but with gently curved sides. Lower leaves of Helianthus devernii have the same shape, but are shorter, 4.1–5.6 cm (1.6–2.2 in) long and 4.4–9.0 mm (0.17–0.35 in) wide, and are usually shed by the time the plant flowers. Leaves get shorter and thinner further up the stems ranging from 2.6–6.4 cm (1.0–2.5 in), though usually shorter than 5.1 cm (2.0 in), and just 1.2–1.7 mm (0.05–0.07 in) wide with a very thin and grasslike shape. The leaves also alternate rather than being opposite each other higher up on the plant.

The apparent flower is, as with most sunflowers, made up of many small flowers packed together into one head. Stems frequently end in just one flowering head, but sometimes will branch with a head at the end of each one. The petals of the ray flowers are yellow and 7.3–10.7 mm (0.29–0.42 in) long, but usually longer than 9.0 mm (0.35 in). They are also 3.8–5.0 mm (0.15–0.20 in) wide and have three teeth at the ends. There are five to eight ray flowers around the twelve to twenty-eight disk flowers.

The seeds, technically called cypselae, are 3.5–4.0 mm (0.14–0.16 in) long and have four sides. They are colored tan with darker brown specks.

Helianthus devernii can be distinguished from its close relative that also grows in Nevada, Helianthus cusickii because it has leaves that have just one prominent vein where H. cusickii has three. When blooming H. cusickii also has flower petals that are longer than 20 mm where H. devernii generally has petals shorter than 10 mm.

== Taxonomy ==
In 2007, a researcher was conducting botanical surveys throughout the Spring Mountains in Nevada. The botanist did not recognize the plant, and it was not possible to use a dichotomous key because the inflorescences were too young. The botanist returned several weeks later but was unable to make a positive identification using regional floras. The plant was brought to Wesley Niles at the University of Nevada, Las Vegas but he, too, failed to make a positive identification. Another collection was sent to Edward Schilling at the University of Tennessee, who first suggested pursuance of a potentially new species. The first spring, second spring, and third southern cluster cover 800 square metres (8,600 sq ft), 1,800 square metres (19,000 sq ft), and 4 square metres (43 sq ft), respectively. Helianthus devernii was scientifically described as a species in a paper written by Trent M. Draper that was published in 2021. He selected the name to honor his grandfather, DeVern Campkin, for encouraging a love of science, history and geography. Genetic data indicates that it is most closely related to Helianthus pumilus, another sunflower species in section Ciliares.

As of 2024 it is an accepted species according to Plants of the World Online and World Plants, but is listed as "unchecked" by World Flora Online. U.S. Bureau of Land Management (BLM) refers to Helianthus devernii as the Calico Basin sunflower.

== Distribution and habitat ==
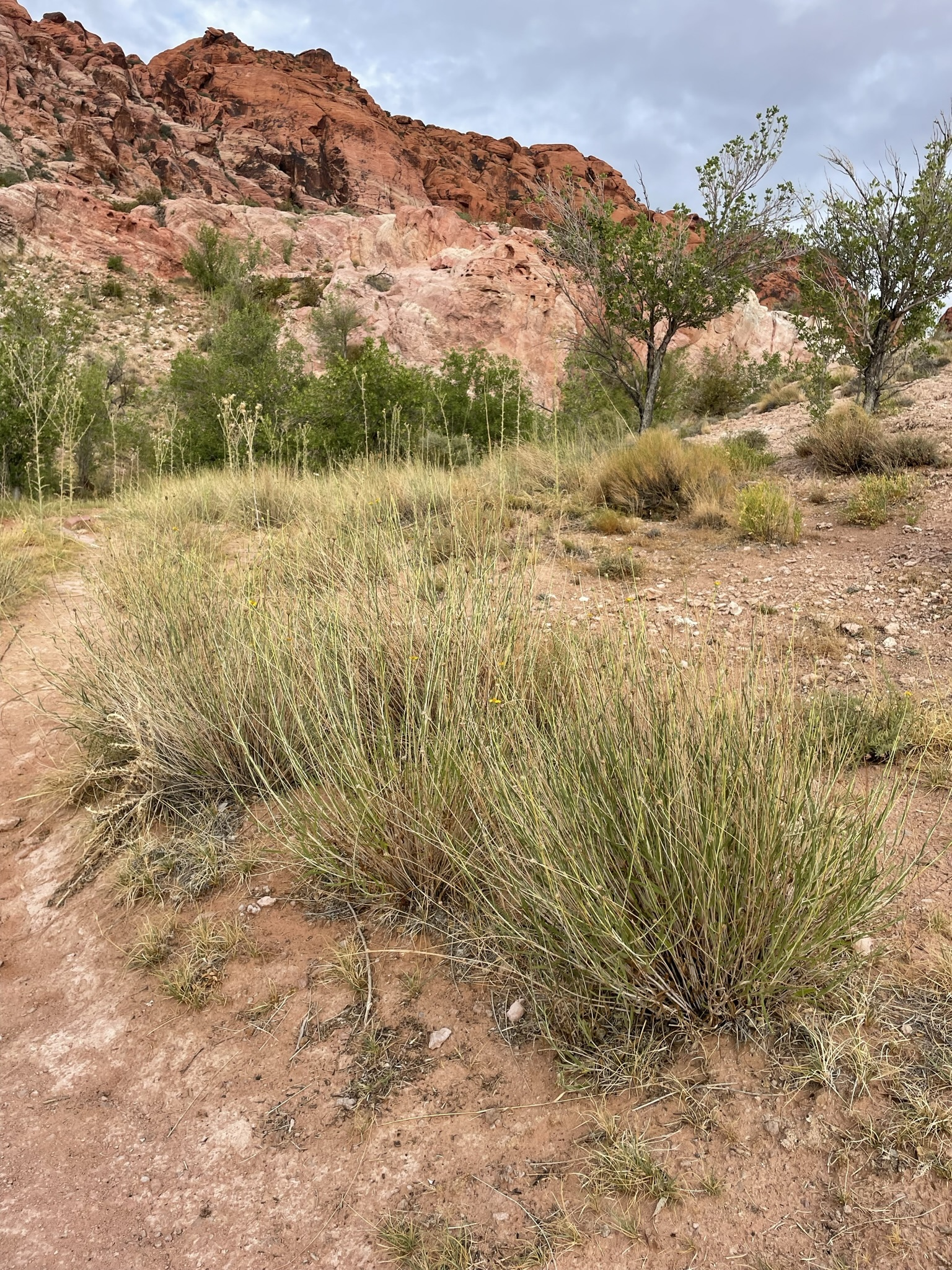
Helianthus devernii, a rare endemic species blooming in Clark County, Nevada

The perennial herb is found within and around a small portion of Red Rock Canyon National Conservation Area in Clark County, Nevada—a BLM-managed National Conservation Area within the Mojave Desert. Helianthus devernii has been found at two desert spring locations with moist alkaline soils. About 38% of the plants are located on BLM lands, 62% of the plants are on adjacent private inholdings.

Original counts put the total number of individuals at around 400. Further surveys increased the total known number of individual plants to 725.

== Conservation ==
As of 2024, it is listed as a critically endangered and fully protected species by the State of Nevada. It is considered critically imperiled due to its limited range and the threats in the area, including recreation. Noxious and invasive weeds are prevalent in the area, including Brassica tournefortii, Salsola tragus, Schismus spp. Invasive animals, like the burro, also threaten the plant.

== Gallery ==
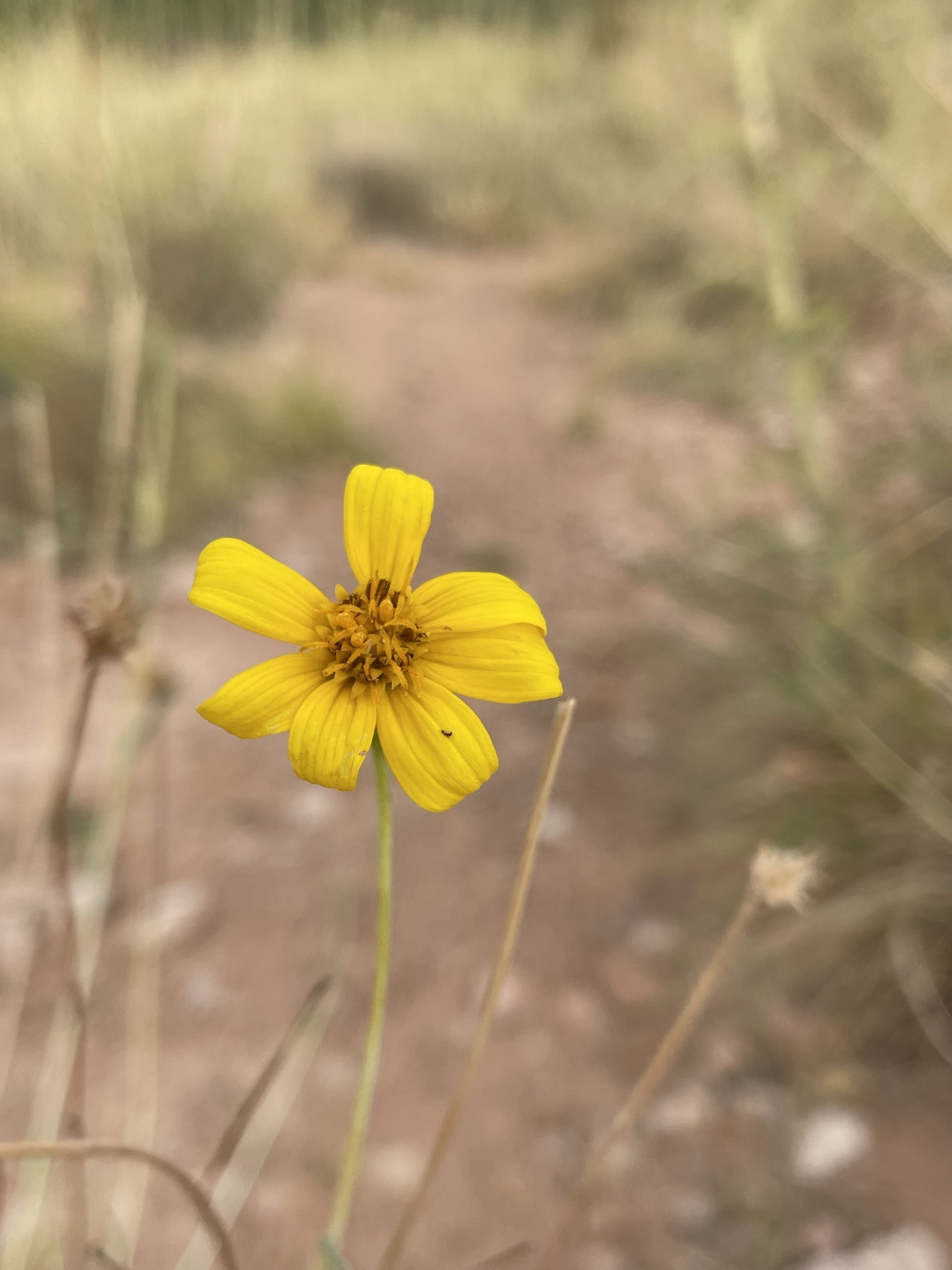
Flowering head, front view

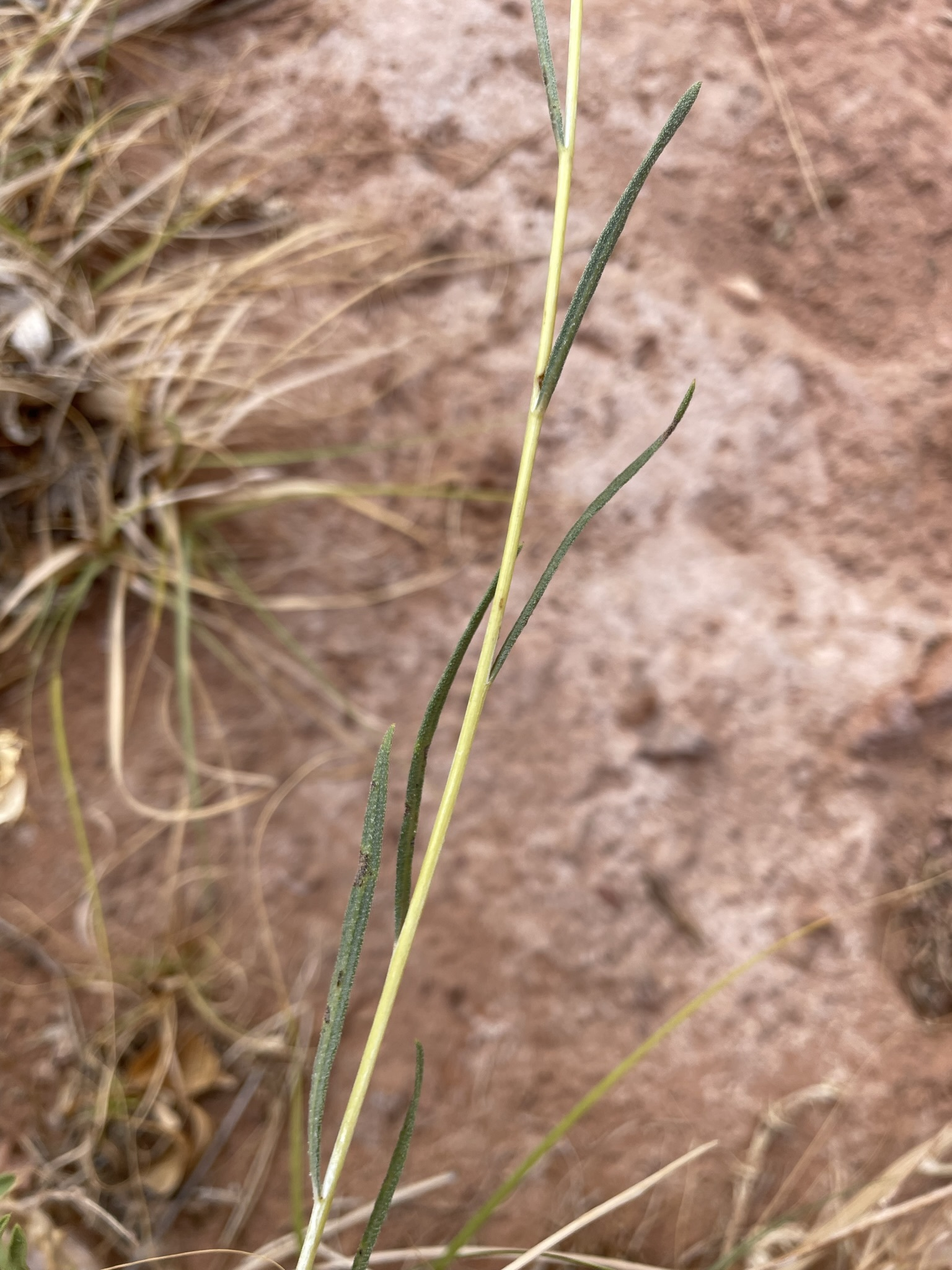
Alternate leaves on Helianthus devernii

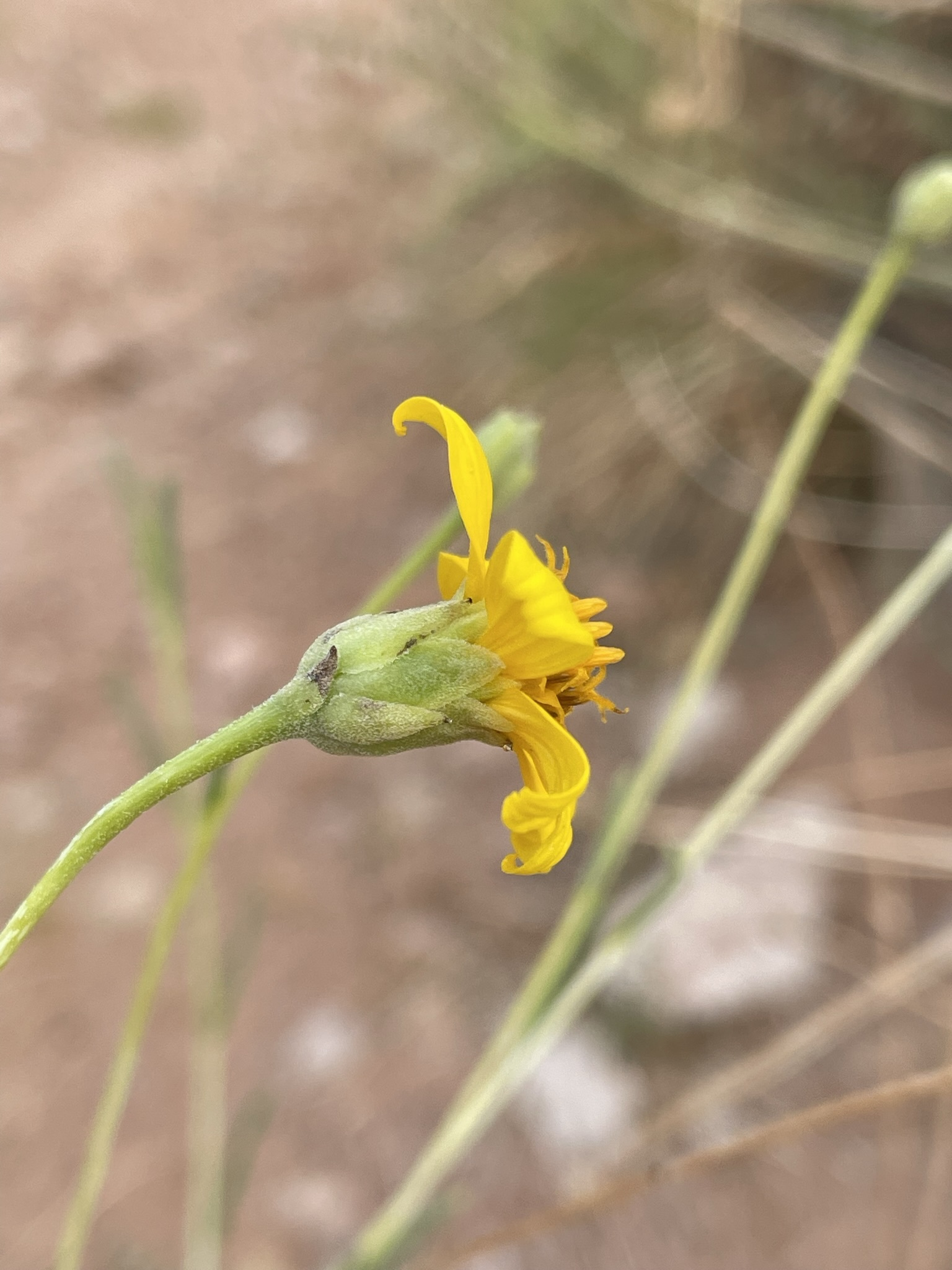
Flowering head, side view
