= H. californica =

H. californica may refer to:

- Hackelia californica, the California stickseed, a flowering plant species native to the mountains of northern California and southern Oregon
- Helianthella californica, the California helianthella, a flowering plant species native to the mountains of California and Oregon
- Horkelia californica, the California horkelia, a flowering plant species endemic to California
- Hulsea californica, the San Diego alpinegold and San Diego sunflower, a rare flowering plant species endemic to southern California

== Synonyms ==
- Hyalophora californica, a synonym for Hyalophora euryalus, the ceanothus silkmoth, a moth species found from British Columbia to south to Baja California

== See also ==
- List of Latin and Greek words commonly used in systematic names#C
