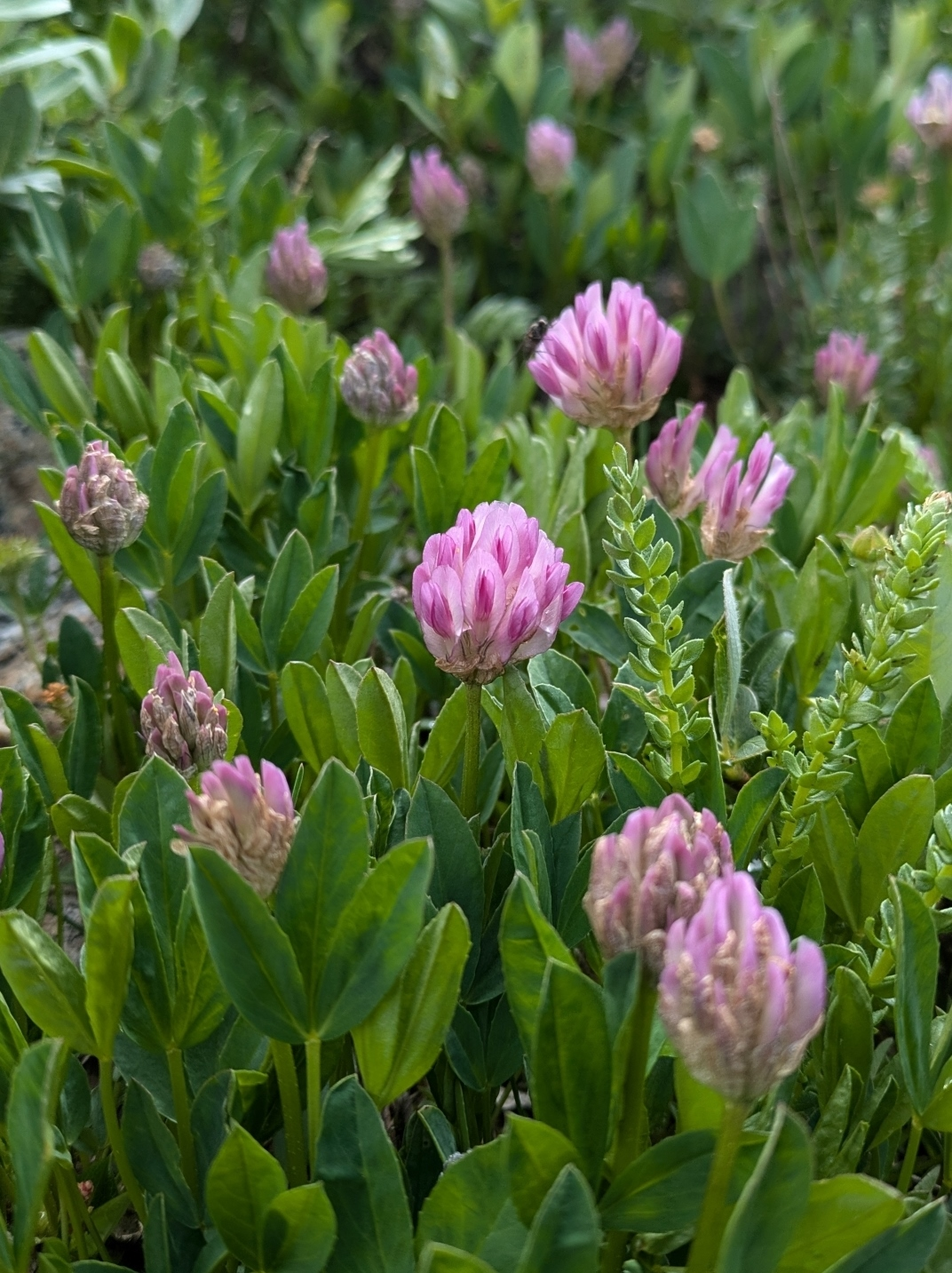
- Trifolium parryi blooming near timberline in the Arapaho National Forest, Colorado

Conservation status
- Secure (NatureServe)

Scientific classification
- Kingdom: Plantae
- Clade: Tracheophytes
- Clade: Angiosperms
- Clade: Eudicots
- Clade: Rosids
- Order: Fabales
- Family: Fabaceae
- Subfamily: Faboideae
- Genus: Trifolium
- Species: T. parryi

Binomial name
- Trifolium parryi A.Gray

Subspecies and varieties
- Trifolium parryi var. montanense (Rydb.) S.L.Welsh; Trifolium parryi subsp. parryi; Trifolium parryi subsp. salictorum (Greene ex Rydb.) J.M.Gillett

= Trifolium parryi =

Plant species in the clover genus

Trifolium parryi, commonly known as Parry's clover or Parry clover, is a high altitude species of plant from the western United States. It grows in the Rocky Mountains from southern Montana to northern New Mexico. It is a short plant that is adapted to the harsh conditions and short growing season near and above timberline.

== Description ==
Trifolium parryi is a short species of herbaceous plant that has either very short stems or no stems at all and only grows to 4–25 centimeters (1 1/2–10 in) in height. Though short in stature it is the tallest of the clovers that grow in the alpine tundra with larger, showier flowers than the other alpine clovers. The plants grow to form continuous mats, spreading by branching, slender rhizomes. The leaves and stems grow from structure called a caudex. Older plants develop a substantial taproot.

The leaves are compound and have the classic three leaflets of the clover genus. The leaves are attached directly to the base of the plant by small leaf stems called petioles, which range in length from 8 millimeters (3/8 in) to 19 cm (7 1/2 in). Each of the three leaflets is 5–43 mm (1/4–1 3/4 in) long, 1.5–16 mm (1/16–5/8 in) wide, and hairless. The leaflets have toothed edges towards their base and may have their widest point toward the base, the midpoint, or toward the end.

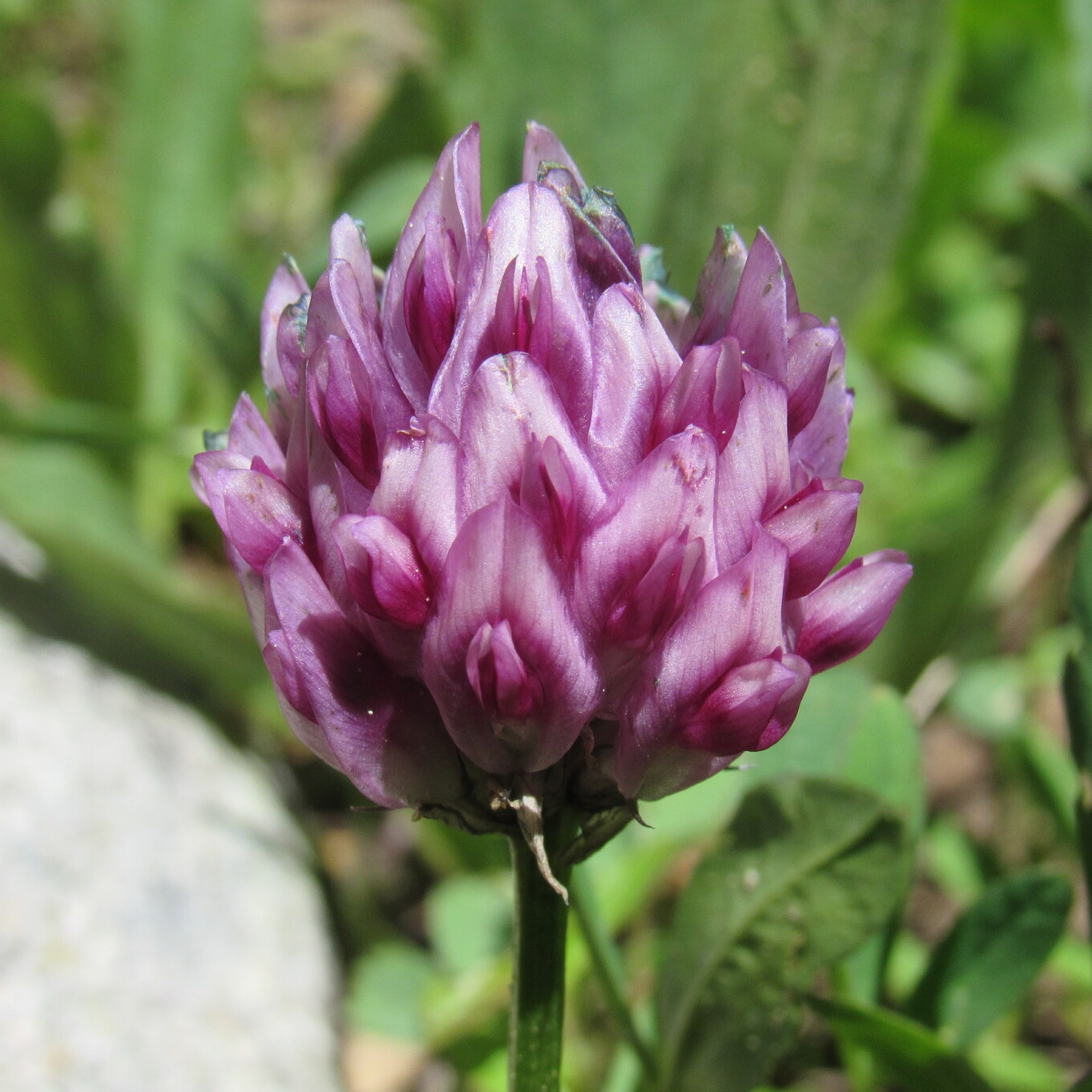
Flowering head

Flower heads extend above the leaf canopy on flower stems (peduncles) 1.8–22 cm (3/4–8 3/4 in) long, that spring from the stems when present. Each flower head has five to thirty very small flowers forming the rounded head. The individual flowers are 12–22 mm (1/2–7/8 in) long. They are deep pink to a rose in color and noticeably fragrant. Flowering may occur in the summer or early fall, June to September in its native habit.

The fruit is a simple carpel, often called a pod, each containing one to four seeds. The flower petals wither and turn yellow-brown, but continue to enclose the pods as they develop and ripen.

== Taxonomy ==
Trifolium parryi was scientifically described and named by Asa Gray in 1862.

It has three subdivisions, two subspecies and one variety according to Plants of the World Online and World Flora Online. World Plants lists all three subdivisions as subspecies.

=== Trifolium parryi var. montanense ===
The variety montanense was first described as a species by Per Axel Rydberg in 1900 using the name Trifolium montanense. It was described as a subspecies by John Montague Gillett (1918-2014) in 1965 and as a variety in 1978 by Stanley Larson Welsh (1928-). It is found in Idaho, Montana, Utah, and Wyoming.

=== Trifolium parryi subsp. parryi ===
The autonymic subspecies grows in New Mexico, Colorado, and Wyoming.

=== Trifolium parryi subsp. salictorum ===
Subspecies salictorum was first described by Rydberg in 1906 using a partial description by Edward Lee Greene. It was initially described as the species Trifolium salictorum before being described as a subspecies by Gillett in 1965. It is endemic to Colorado. According to the USDA it is found in ten mountain counties. The subspecies has thicker leaves that are less sharply pointed. The flower heads are longer and are supported by thicker flower stems than subspecies parryi.

=== Names ===
The clover genus, Trifolium, is named in botanical Latin as three leaves. The species name was selected by Gray to honor the plant collector Charles Christopher Parry. It is one of at least seven examples of species Gray named for Parry that still bear his name, such as Arnica parryi, Ericameria parryi, Helianthella parryi, Oreochrysum parryi, Campanula parryi and Pedicularis parryi.

In English, the species is very often called Parry's clover. A variant on this common name is Parry clover. It is also sometimes known as rose clover or alpine clover, though the species Trifolium dasyphyllum is more often called alpine clover and Trifolium hirtum is more commonly called rose clover.

== Distribution and habitat ==
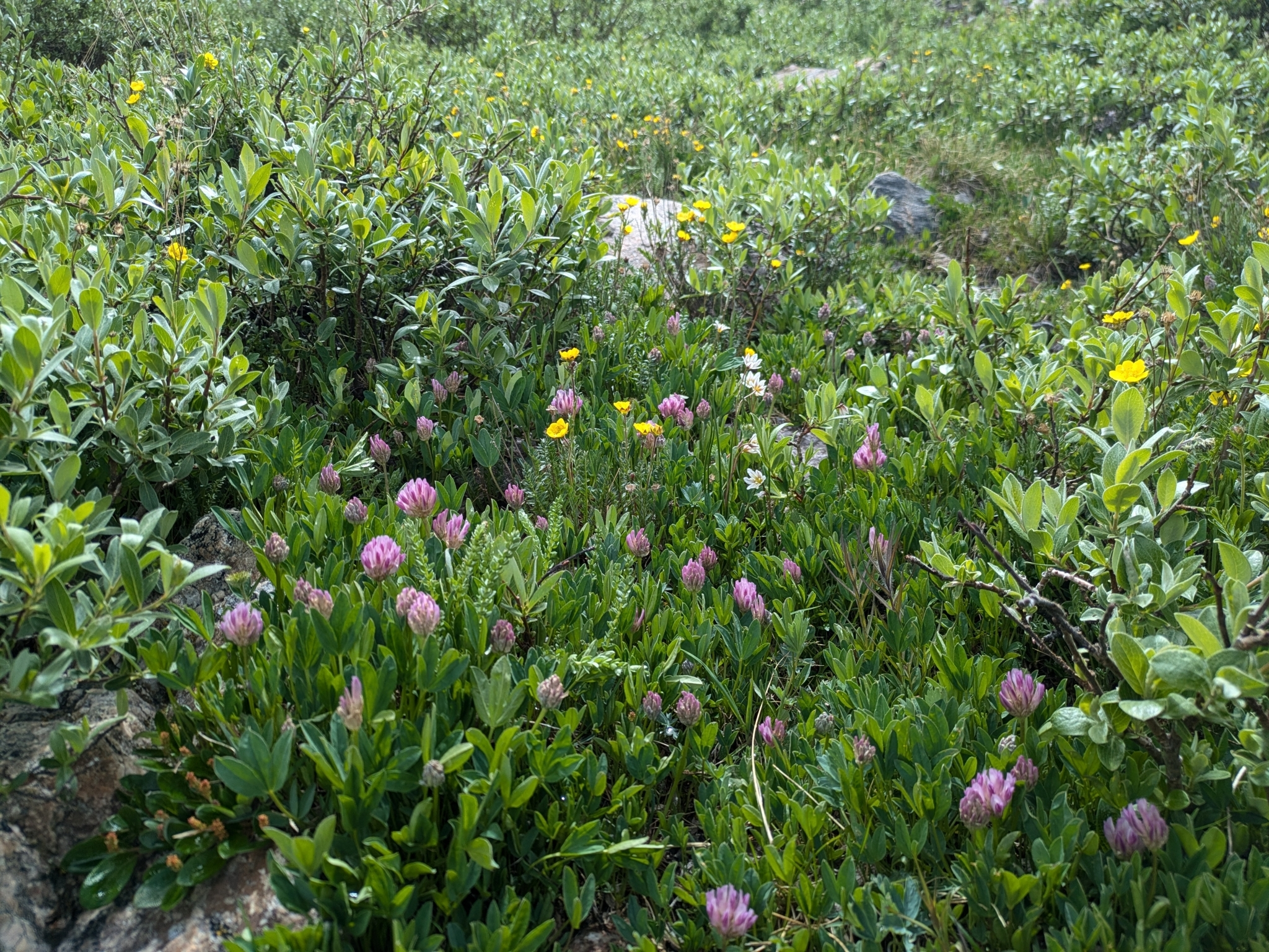
Trifolium parryi with other alpine plants including Gagea serotina

Trifolium parryi grows in the Rocky Mountains in the Western United States. In the Montana it is found in the counties around Yellowstone National Park, Madison, Gallatin, Park, and Carbon Counties. In Idaho it is only recorded in Fremont County, one bordering Gallatin County. In Wyoming it grows in two northern counties, Park and Hot Springs, and in two southern counties, Carbon and Albany counties. It is found in many of the eastern counties of Utah and in most of the mountain counties of Colorado. In New Mexico it only grows in Taos County.

In the alpine tundra Trifolium parryi specializes in growing in areas covered in snowbanks despite this shortening the growing season to less than 80 days. In the subalpine zone it grows in meadows and alongside streams and creeks. In all its habitats it prefers rocky soils and will grow on the rocky scree slopes from landslides and at the bases of cliffs. It grows at elevations of 3,350 to 4,025 meters (11,000 to 13,200 ft).

It was evaluated by NatureServe as "globally secure" (G5) in 2001. It has been evaluated as "apparently secure" (S4) in Montana and "vulnerable" (S3) in Wyoming, but has not been evaluated in the rest of its range.

== Ecology ==
Trifolium parryi depends on the golden-belted bumblebee for pollination. In areas where there are more individuals of this species of bumblebee the plants set more seed.
