= Bush sunflower =

Bush sunflower is a common name for several plants and may refer to:

- Encelia
- Helianthus pumilus, native to the western United States
