= Hellinsia sulphureodactylus =

Scientific classification
- Kingdom: Animalia
- Phylum: Arthropoda
- Clade: Pancrustacea
- Class: Insecta
- Order: Lepidoptera
- Family: Pterophoridae
- Genus: Hellinsia
- Species: H. sulphureodactylus

Binomial name
- Hellinsia sulphureodactylus (Packard, 1873)

Synonyms
- Pterophorus sulphureodactylus Packard, 1873; Lioptilus sulphureus Walsingham, 1880

Species of moth

Hellinsia sulphureodactylus is a moth of the family Pterophoridae. It is found in North America (including Colorado, California, Iowa and Alberta).

The wingspan is about 25 mm. The head is ochreous. The palpi are whitish yellow, streaked with ochreous and the antennae are long and yellowish tinged with fuscous. The thorax and abdomen are sulphur yellow, streaked with ochreous scales. The legs are whitish ochreous, streaked with brown. The forewings are clear sulphur yellow, slightly tinged with brownish on the outer fourth of the costa. There is a minute brown dot before the base of the fissure. The fringes are pale yellowish white, but cinereous on the hind margin. The hindwings are whitish, thickly dusted with cinereous. The fringes are concolorous.

The larvae have been recorded feeding on Helianthus pumilus.
