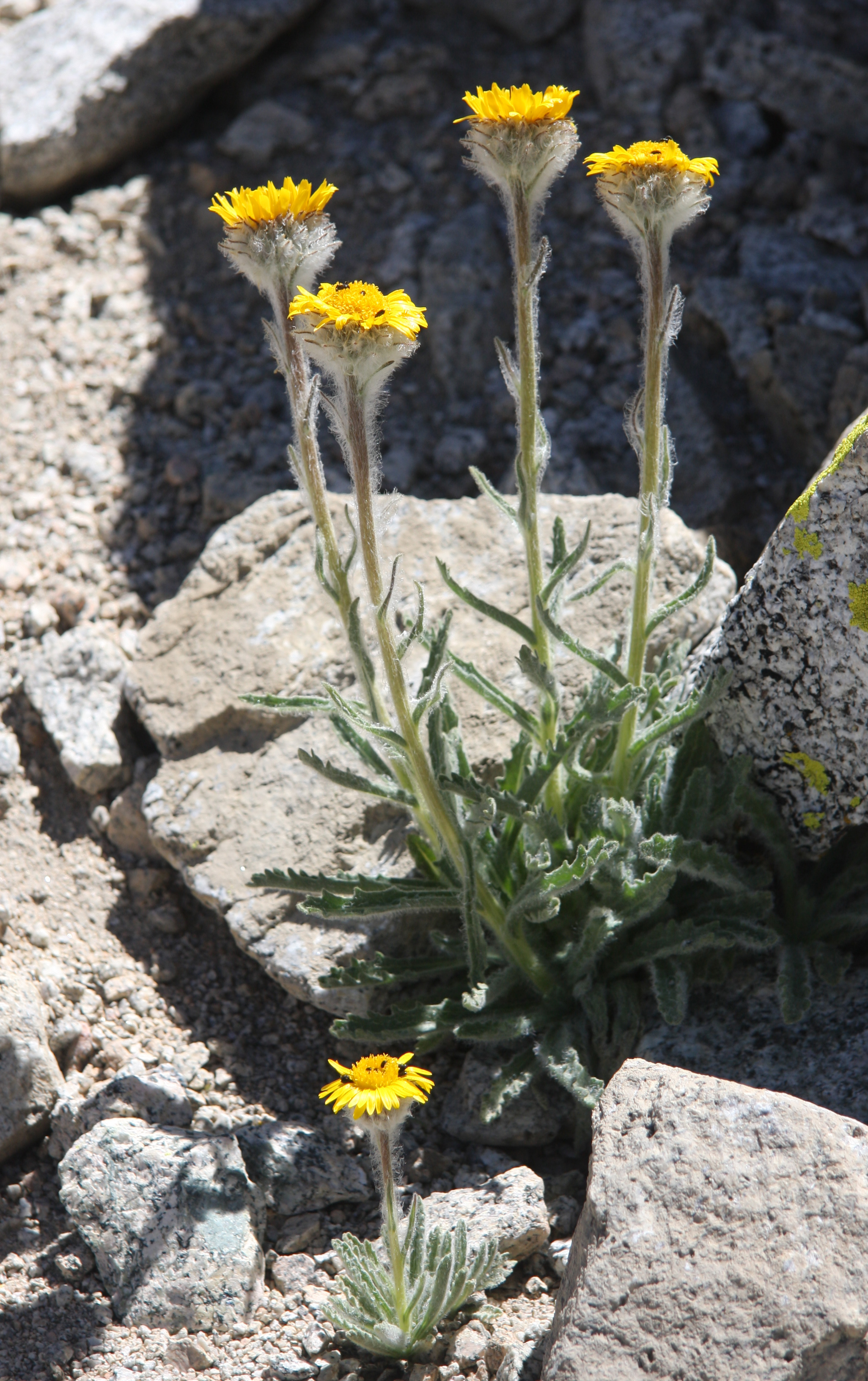
- Kings Canyon National Park, California

Scientific classification
- Kingdom: Plantae
- Clade: Tracheophytes
- Clade: Angiosperms
- Clade: Eudicots
- Clade: Asterids
- Order: Asterales
- Family: Asteraceae
- Genus: Hulsea
- Species: H. algida

Binomial name
- Hulsea algida A.Gray

Synonyms
- Hulsea caespitosa A.Nelson & P.B.Kenn.; Hulsea carnosa Rydb.; Hulsea nevadensis Gand.

= Hulsea algida =

Species of flowering plant

Hulsea algida is a species of flowering plant in the daisy family, known by the common name Pacific hulsea or alpine gold. It is native to the western United States.

== Description ==
H. algida is a hairy, glandular perennial herb producing stout erect stems approaching 40 centimeters (16 inches) in height. The dark green leaves are narrow and covered in white hairs, and the edges are wavy and toothed. Most of the leaves occur in a thick patch at the base of the plant, where they can reach 15 cm (6 in) in length, and some grow from the stems.

Appearing from July to September, the pseudanthium (flower head) is encased in a cup of densely woolly reddish green phyllaries which open to reveal a daisy-like bloom 5–9 cm (2–3 1/2 in) wide. The center of the head is filled with yellow or orange disc florets and the circumference has up to 60 bright yellow or gold ray florets each about 1 cm long with rounded or toothed tips. The fruit is an achene up to 1 cm long with a pappus which may be longer.

H. nana is similar, but rarely more than 10 cm (4 in) tall, with a leafless stalk and 21 ray flowers per pseudanthium.

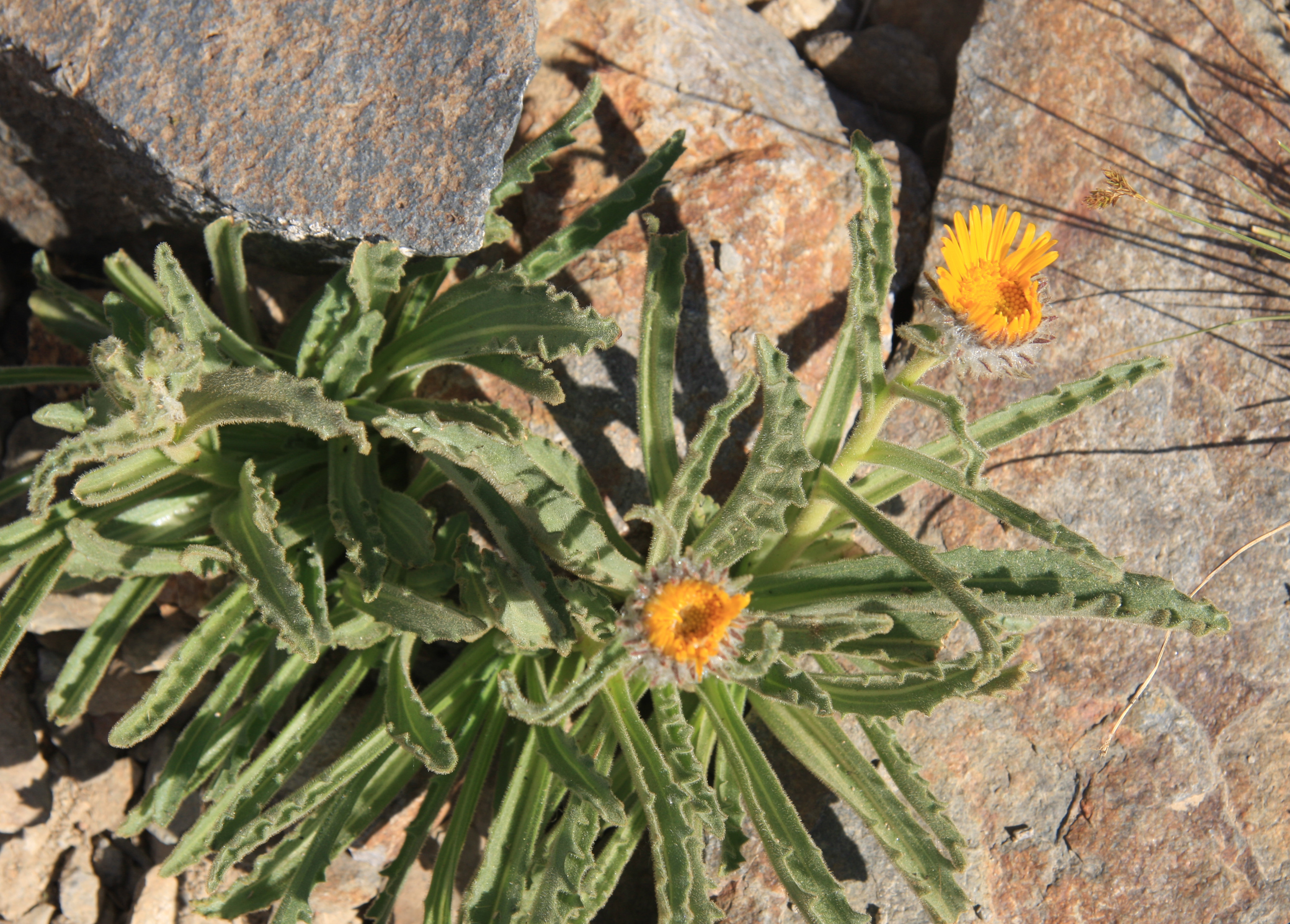
Top view of flowers opening

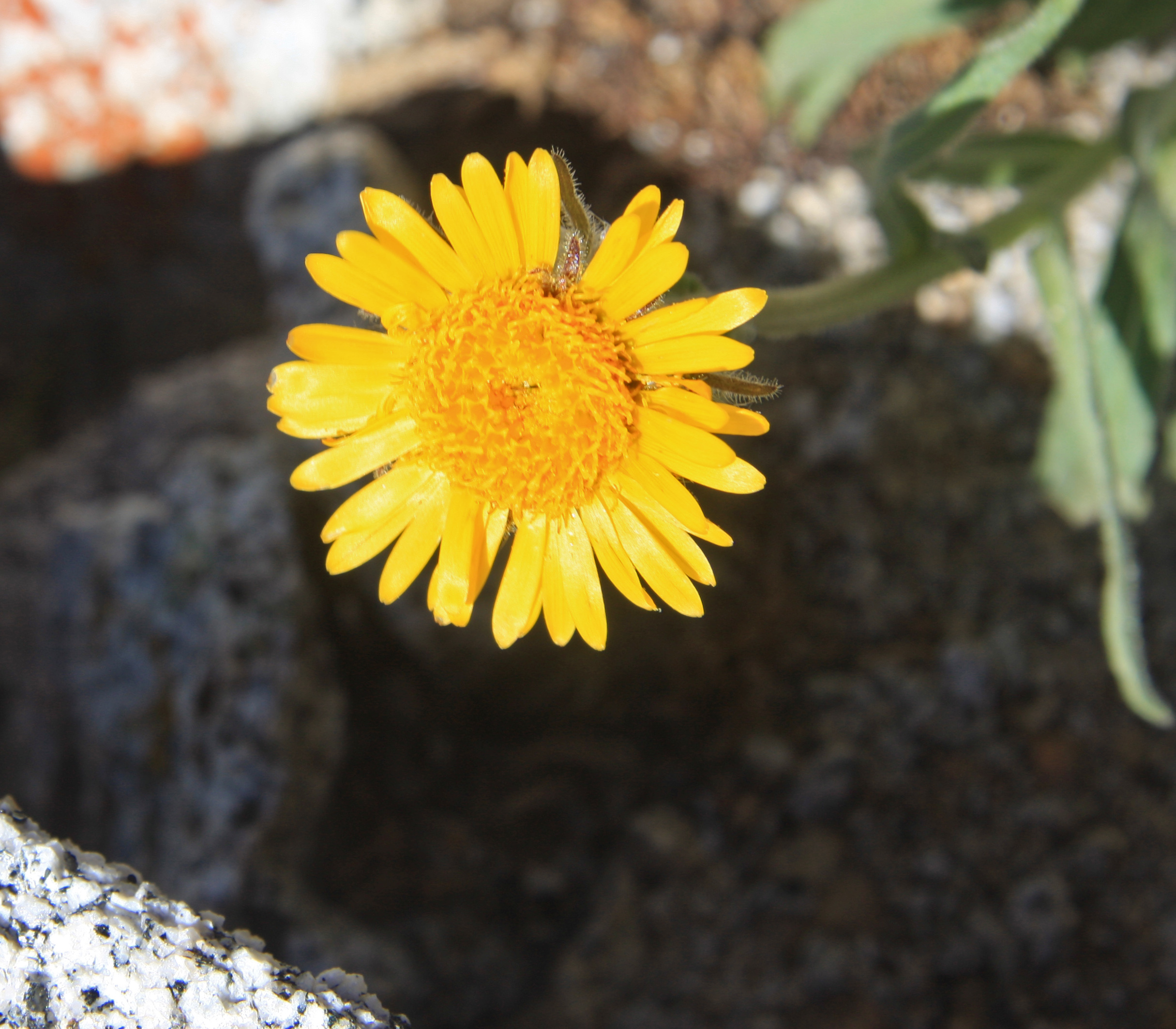
Flower close-up

== Distribution and habitat ==
The species is native to California, Oregon, Nevada, Idaho, Montana, and Wyoming. Within California, it grows in the Sierra Nevada and in the White Mountains. It grows between 2,900 and 4,300 metres (9,500 and 14,000 feet) in elevation, in alpine and subalpine talus habitats.
