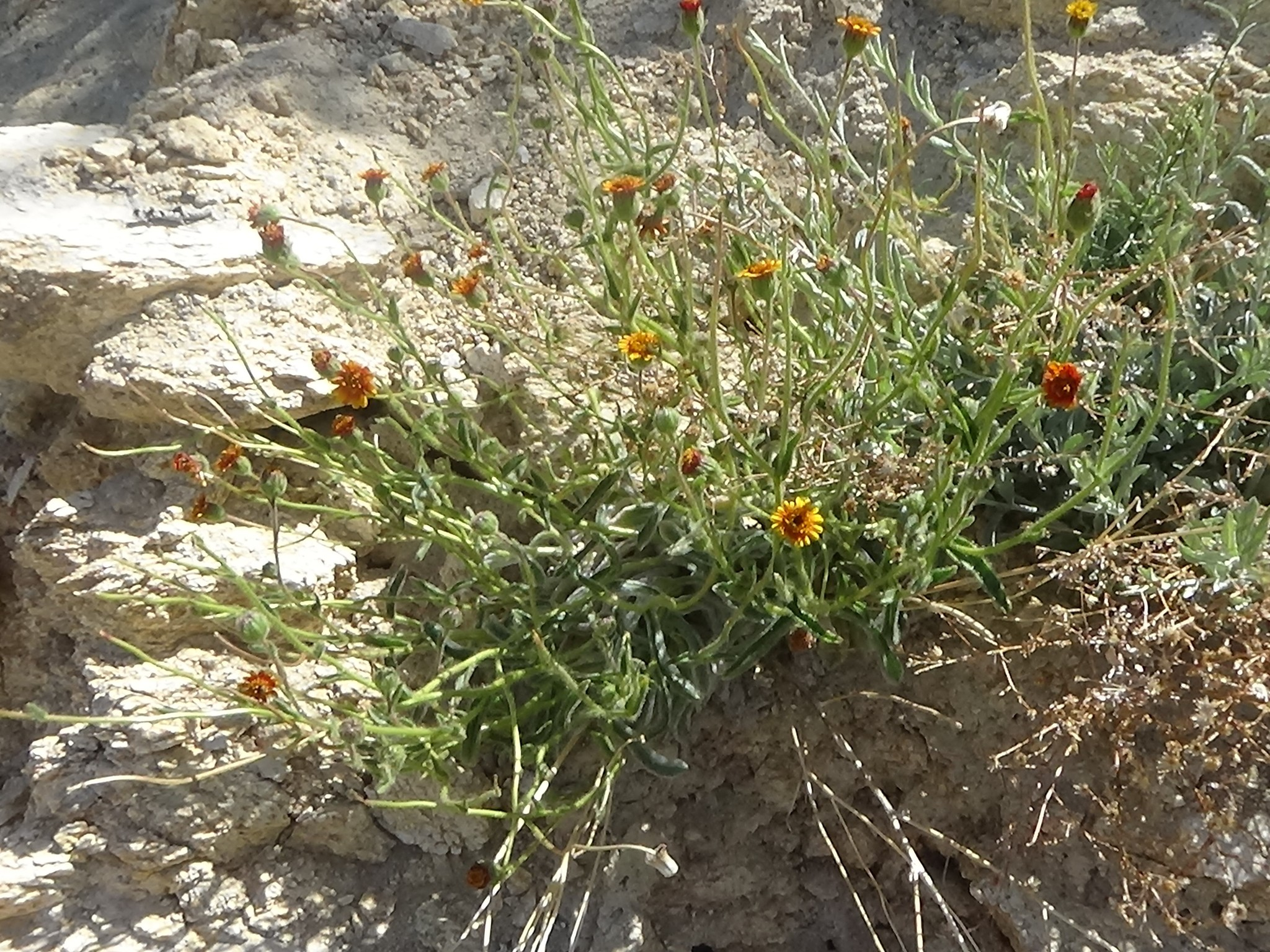

Scientific classification
- Kingdom: Plantae
- Clade: Tracheophytes
- Clade: Angiosperms
- Clade: Eudicots
- Clade: Asterids
- Order: Asterales
- Family: Asteraceae
- Genus: Hulsea
- Species: H. vestita

Binomial name
- Hulsea vestita A.Gray

Synonyms
- Hulsea callicarpha (H.M.Hall) S.Watson ex Rydb.; Hulsea parryi A.Gray; Hulsea inyoensis (D. D. Keck) Munz; Hulsea californica var. inyoensis D. D. Keck

= Hulsea vestita =

Species of flowering plant

Hulsea vestita is a species of flowering plant in the family Asteraceae known by the common name pumice alpinegold.

It is native to eastern and southern California, where various subspecies grow in separate mountain ranges from the High Sierra to the Transverse Ranges and Peninsular Ranges, and Madrean Sky Islands in the Mojave Desert. One subspecies (Hulsea vestita ssp. inyoensis) also occurs in western Nevada.

The plant can generally be found on the talus of mountain slopes, often in soils of volcanic origin.

== Description ==
Hulsea vestita is a perennial herb growing a basal patch of thick leaves and stems up to a meter (40 inches) tall, but generally much shorter. The woolly, spoon-shaped leaves are gray-green and may have ruffled edges.

The thick flower heads have glandular, hairy green phyllaries. The center of the daisylike head contains many long golden disc florets and a fringe of golden to reddish ray florets up to 2 centimeters (0.8 inches) long.

Subspecies

Subspecies of Hulsea vestita include:

- Hulsea vestita ssp. callicarpha (beautiful hulsea) — Southern California
- Hulsea vestita ssp. gabrielensis (San Gabriel Mtns. sunflower) — San Gabriel Mountains, other Transverse Ranges.
- Hulsea vestita ssp. inyoensis (Inyo hulsea, pumice alpinegold) — Inyo Mountains, Death Valley N.P. ranges, and others in Inyo/Mono Counties & W. Nevada.
- Hulsea vestita ssp. parryi (Parry's alpinegold) — San Bernardino Mountains, other Transverse & Peninsular ranges, Sierras.
- Hulsea vestita ssp. pygmaea (pygmy alpinegold) — San Bernardino Mnts, Southern Sierras.
- Hulsea vestita ssp. vestita (pumice alpinegold) — Sierras, east Transverse ranges.
