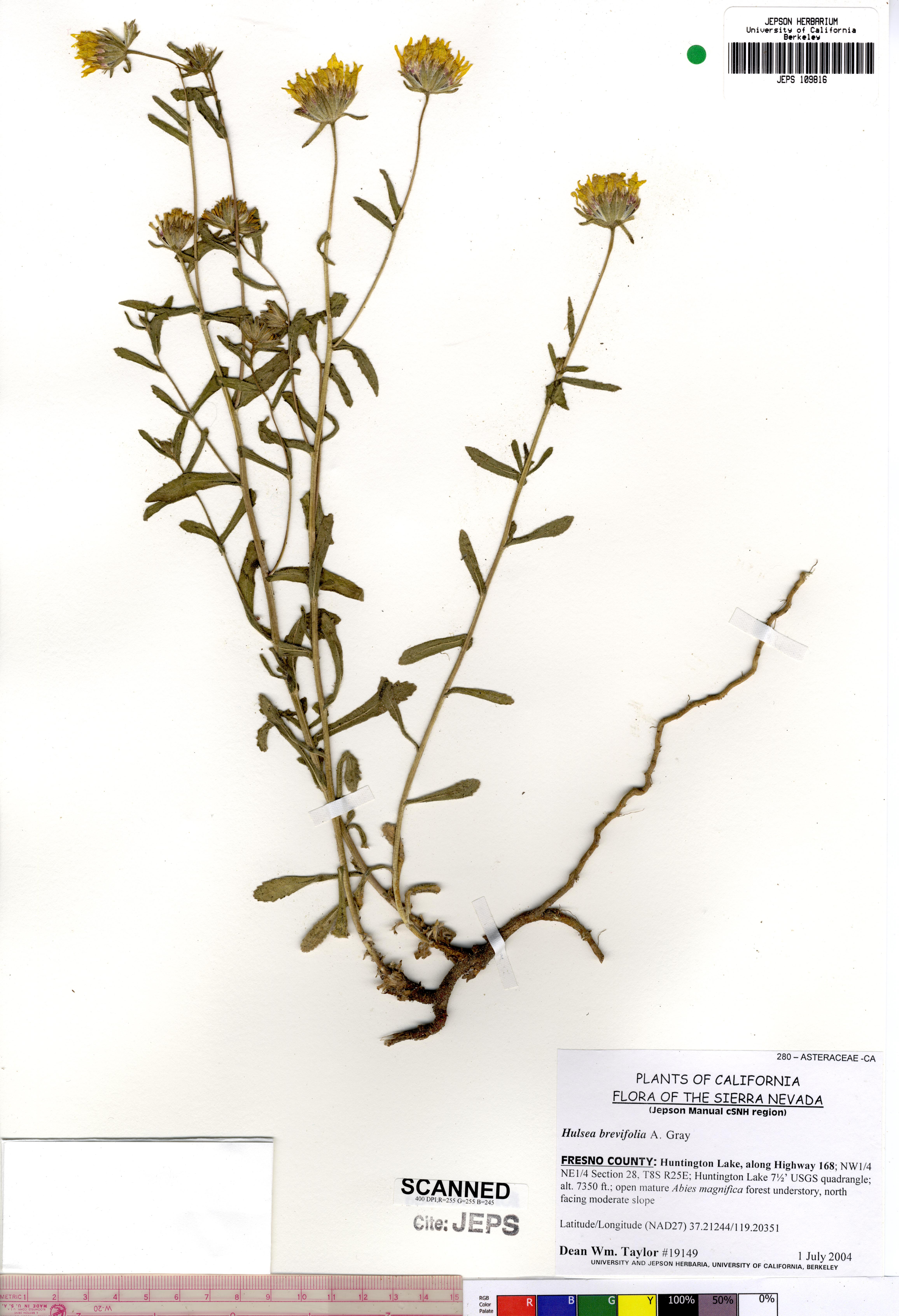

Scientific classification
- Kingdom: Plantae
- Clade: Tracheophytes
- Clade: Angiosperms
- Clade: Eudicots
- Clade: Asterids
- Order: Asterales
- Family: Asteraceae
- Genus: Hulsea
- Species: H. brevifolia

Binomial name
- Hulsea brevifolia A.Gray

= Hulsea brevifolia =

Species of flowering plant

Hulsea brevifolia is a species of flowering plant in the family Asteraceae known by the common name shortleaf alpinegold, or shortleaf hulsea. It is endemic to California, where it is an uncommon resident of the High Sierra. It is found between 6,000–8,000 feet (1,800–2,400 m) in elevation.

== Description ==
Hulsea brevifolia is a perennial herb producing loose tufts of erect stems 30 to 60 centimeters (1–2 feet) tall. The green stems and foliage are covered in glandular hairs. The faintly toothed leaves occur basally and also along the stems. They are 5 to 6 millimeters (0.20-0.24 inches) long and have petioles with stiff hairs along the edges.

The daisylike flower heads are up to 2 centimeters (0.8 inches) wide and have long, hairy, lance-shaped green phyllaries. The center of the head is filled thickly with long yellow disc florets and the circumference is lined with 10–23 yellow ray florets.

The fruit is an achene 6 to 8 centimeters (2.4-3.2 inches) long bearing a pappus which may be red-tinged.
