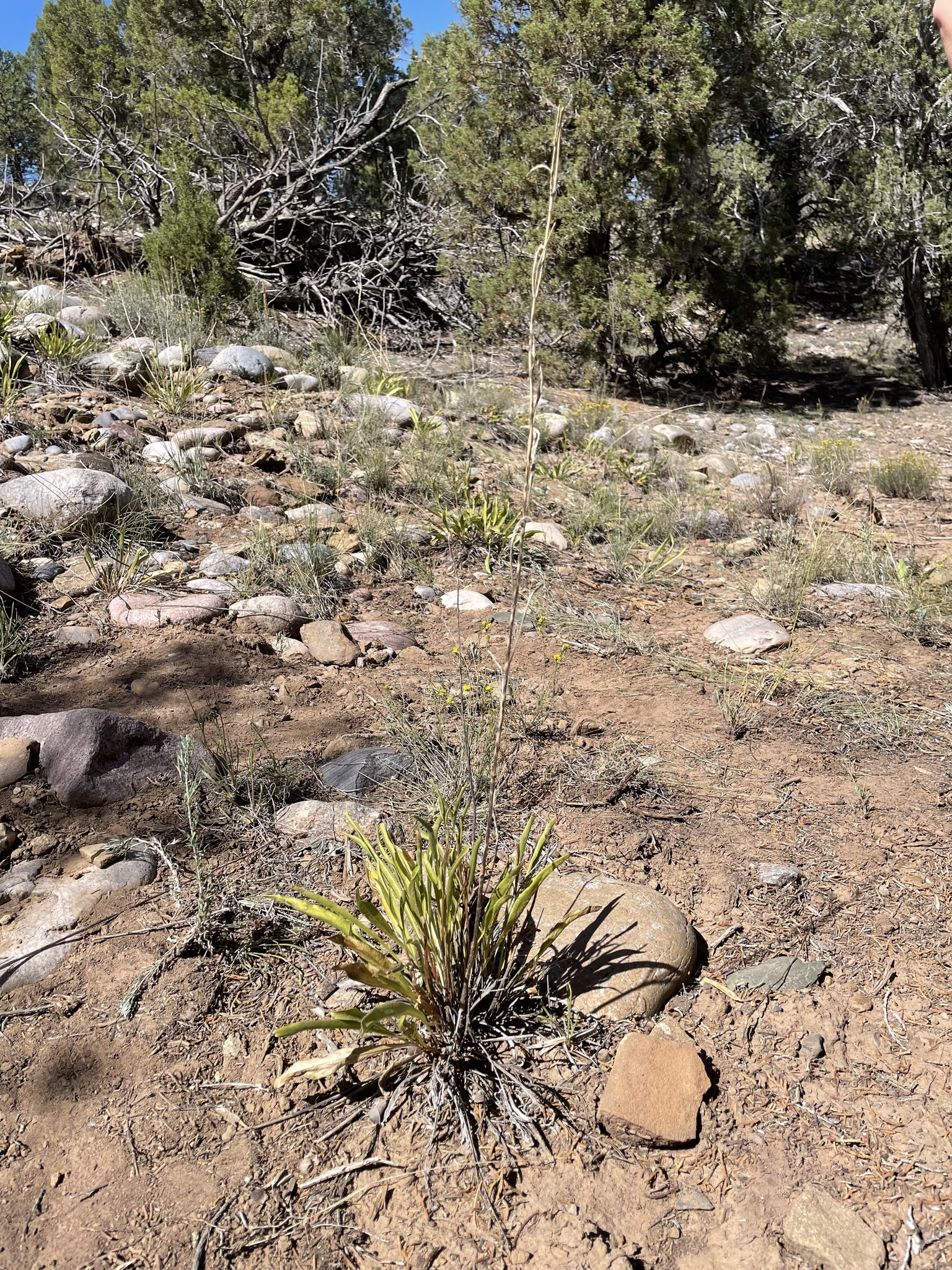

Conservation status
- Vulnerable (NatureServe)

Scientific classification
- Kingdom: Plantae
- Clade: Tracheophytes
- Clade: Angiosperms
- Clade: Eudicots
- Clade: Asterids
- Order: Asterales
- Family: Asteraceae
- Genus: Helianthella
- Species: H. microcephala

Binomial name
- Helianthella microcephala (A.Gray) A.Gray 1883

Synonyms
- Encelia microcephala A.Gray 1873

= Helianthella microcephala =

Species of flowering plant

Helianthella microcephala, common name purpledisk helianthella, is a North American plant species in the family Asteraceae. It grows in the southwestern United States, in the states of Arizona, New Mexico, Colorado, and Utah.

Helianthella microcephala is a herbaceous plant up to 80 cm (31 in) tall. Leaves are up to 25 cm (9.8 in) long. The plant usually produces 3-15 yellow flower heads per stem, in a flat-topped array. Each head contains 5-13 yellow ray flowers surrounding numerous dark brown or dark purple (almost black) disc flowers.
