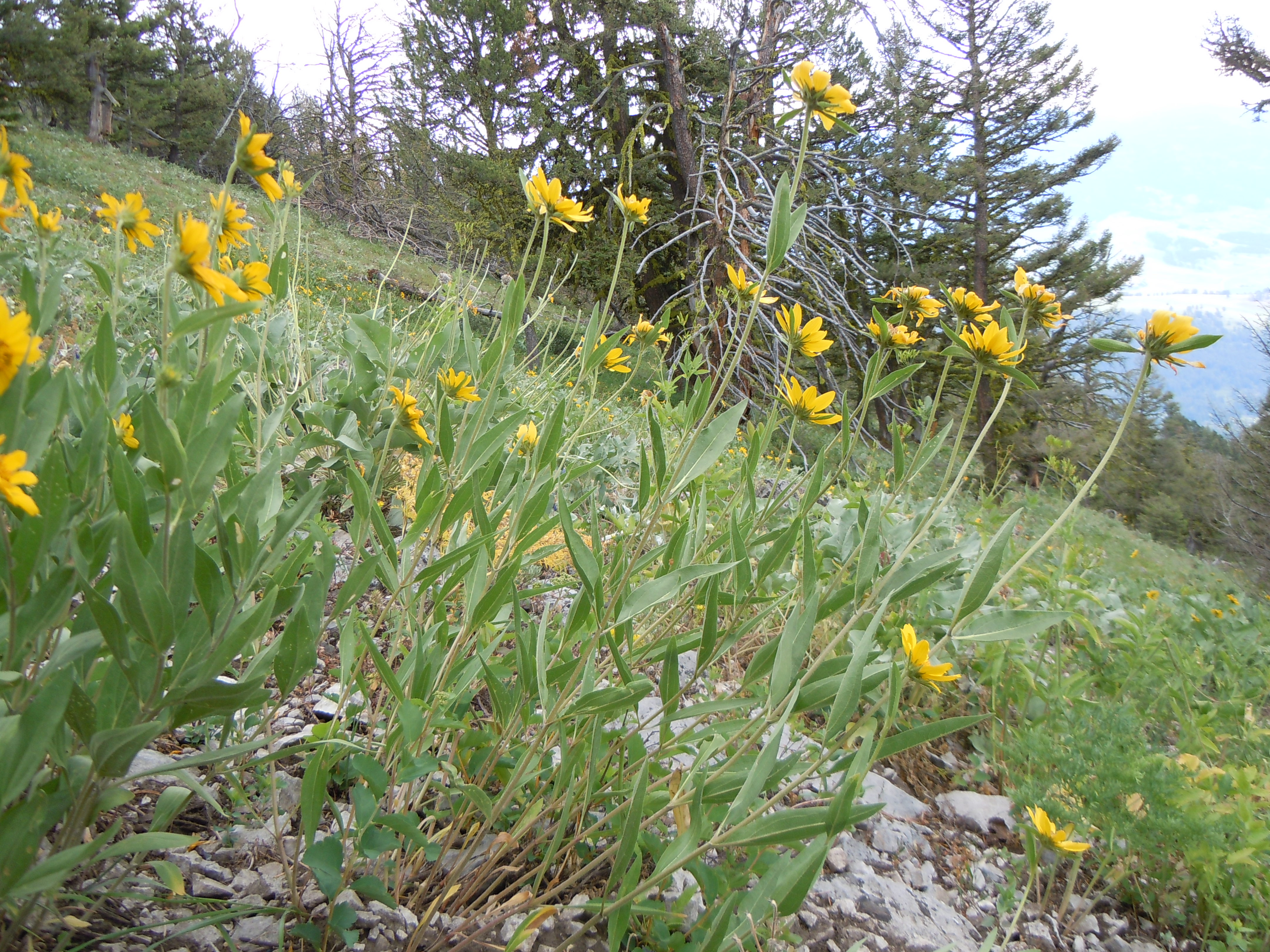

Conservation status
- Secure (NatureServe)

Scientific classification
- Kingdom: Plantae
- Clade: Tracheophytes
- Clade: Angiosperms
- Clade: Eudicots
- Clade: Asterids
- Order: Asterales
- Family: Asteraceae
- Genus: Helianthella
- Species: H. uniflora

Binomial name
- Helianthella uniflora (Nutt.) Torr. & A.Gray 1842

Synonyms
- Helianthus uniflorus Nutt. 1834; Leighia uniflora (Nutt.) Nutt.; Helianthella douglasii Torr. & A.Gray

= Helianthella uniflora =

Species of flowering plant

Helianthella uniflora, the oneflower helianthella, is a North American plant species in the family Asteraceae. It grows in the western United States and western Canada. It has been found from British Columbia south as far as northern Arizona and northern New Mexico.

Helianthella uniflora is a herbaceous plant up to 120 cm (3.9 ft) tall. Leaves are up to 25 cm (9.8 in) long, each with 3 prominent veins running the length of the leaf. The plant usually produces only one yellow flower head per stem, though sometimes 2 or 3, the heads not nodding (hanging). Each head contains 11-21 bright yellow ray flowers surrounding numerous yellow disc flowers.
