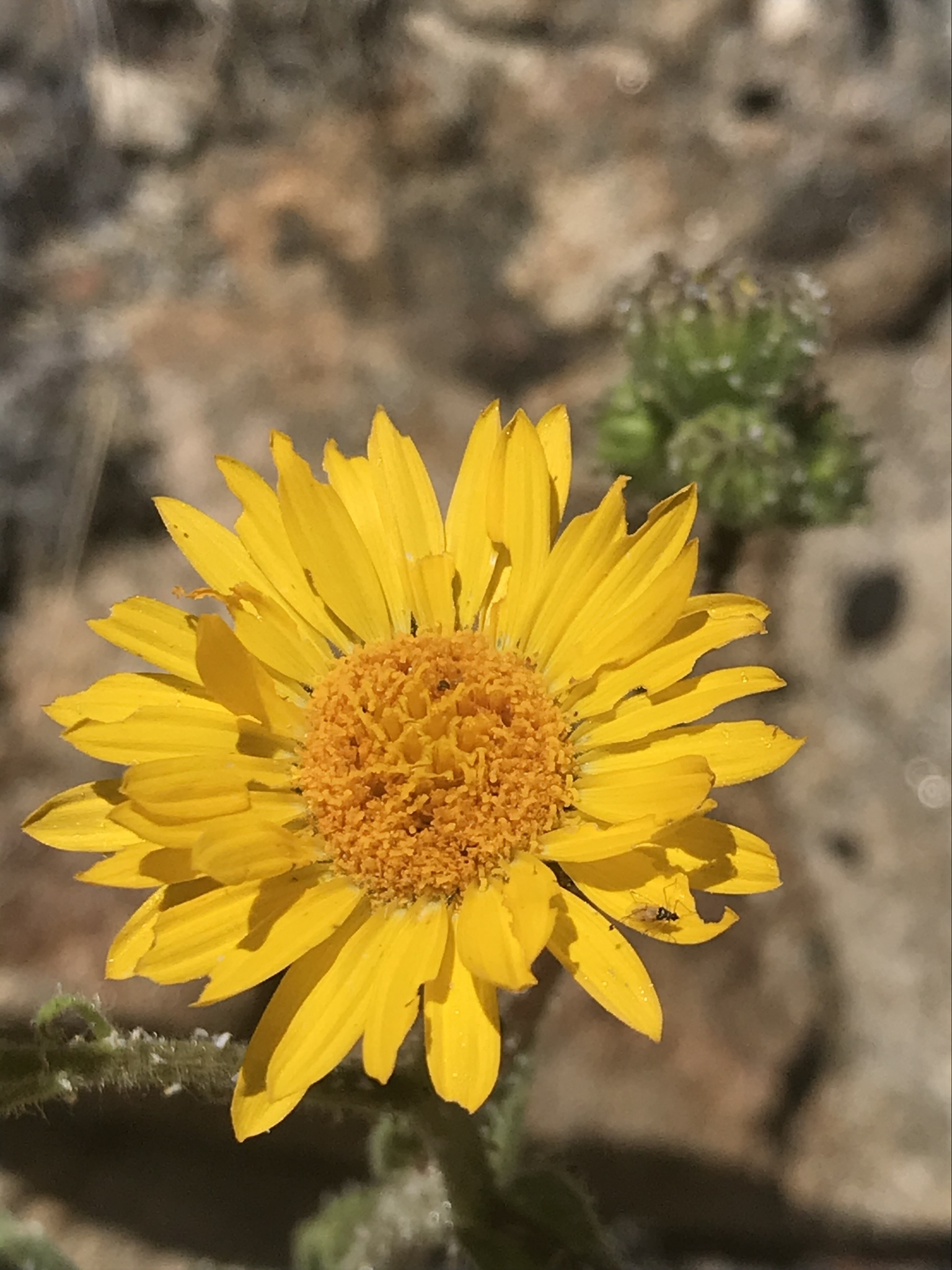

Scientific classification
- Kingdom: Plantae
- Clade: Tracheophytes
- Clade: Angiosperms
- Clade: Eudicots
- Clade: Asterids
- Order: Asterales
- Family: Asteraceae
- Genus: Hulsea
- Species: H. mexicana

Binomial name
- Hulsea mexicana Rydb.

= Hulsea mexicana =

Species of flowering plant

Hulsea mexicana, the Mexican alpinegold or Mexican hulsea is a rare North American species of flowering plant in the family Asteraceae.

It has been found only in a small region straddling the border between Mexico and the United States. It grows in northern Baja California and in southern California (Imperial County and San Diego County). It grows in chaparral, yellow pine forests, and open habitats between 3,000–9,000 feet (910–2,740 m) in elevation. The first botanical specimens collected were from the Mexican side of the border.

== Description ==
Hulsea mexicana is an annuals or biennial herb sometimes reaching 100 cm (39 in) in height. Most of the leaves are on the stem rather than clustered around the base. One plant will generally produce 3–5 flower heads, each with 20–35 ray flowers surrounding a large number of tiny disc flowers.
