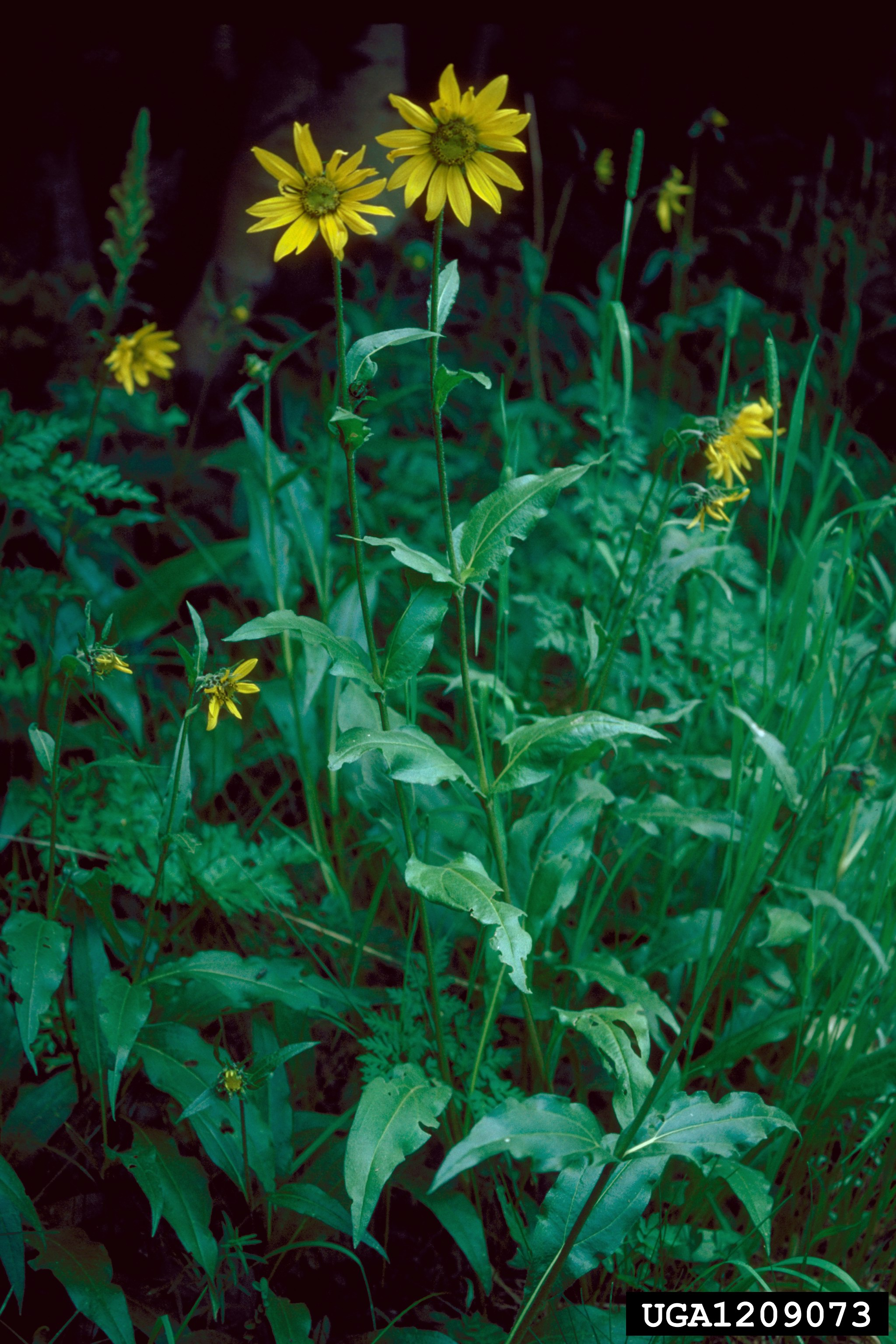

Conservation status
- Secure (NatureServe)

Scientific classification
- Kingdom: Plantae
- Clade: Tracheophytes
- Clade: Angiosperms
- Clade: Eudicots
- Clade: Asterids
- Order: Asterales
- Family: Asteraceae
- Genus: Helianthella
- Species: H. quinquenervis

Binomial name
- Helianthella quinquenervis (Hook.) A.Gray 1883

Synonyms
- Helianthus quinquenervis Hook. 1847

= Helianthella quinquenervis =

Species of flowering plant

Helianthella quinquenervis, the fivenerve helianthella, is a North American plant species in the family Asteraceae. It grows in the mountains of the western United States and northern Mexico. This include the Rockies, the Black Hills, the ranges of the Great Basin, and the northern Sierra Madre, from Montana, Oregon, and South Dakota south as far as western Chihuahua and Coahuila.

Helianthella quinquenervis is a herbaceous plant up to 150 cm (4.9 ft) tall. Leaves are larger than those of most related species, up to 50 cm (20 in) long, each with 3 or 5 prominent veins running the length of the leaf. The plant usually produces only one yellow flower head per stem, nodding (hanging). Each head contains 8-21 bright yellow ray flowers surrounding numerous yellow disc flowers.
