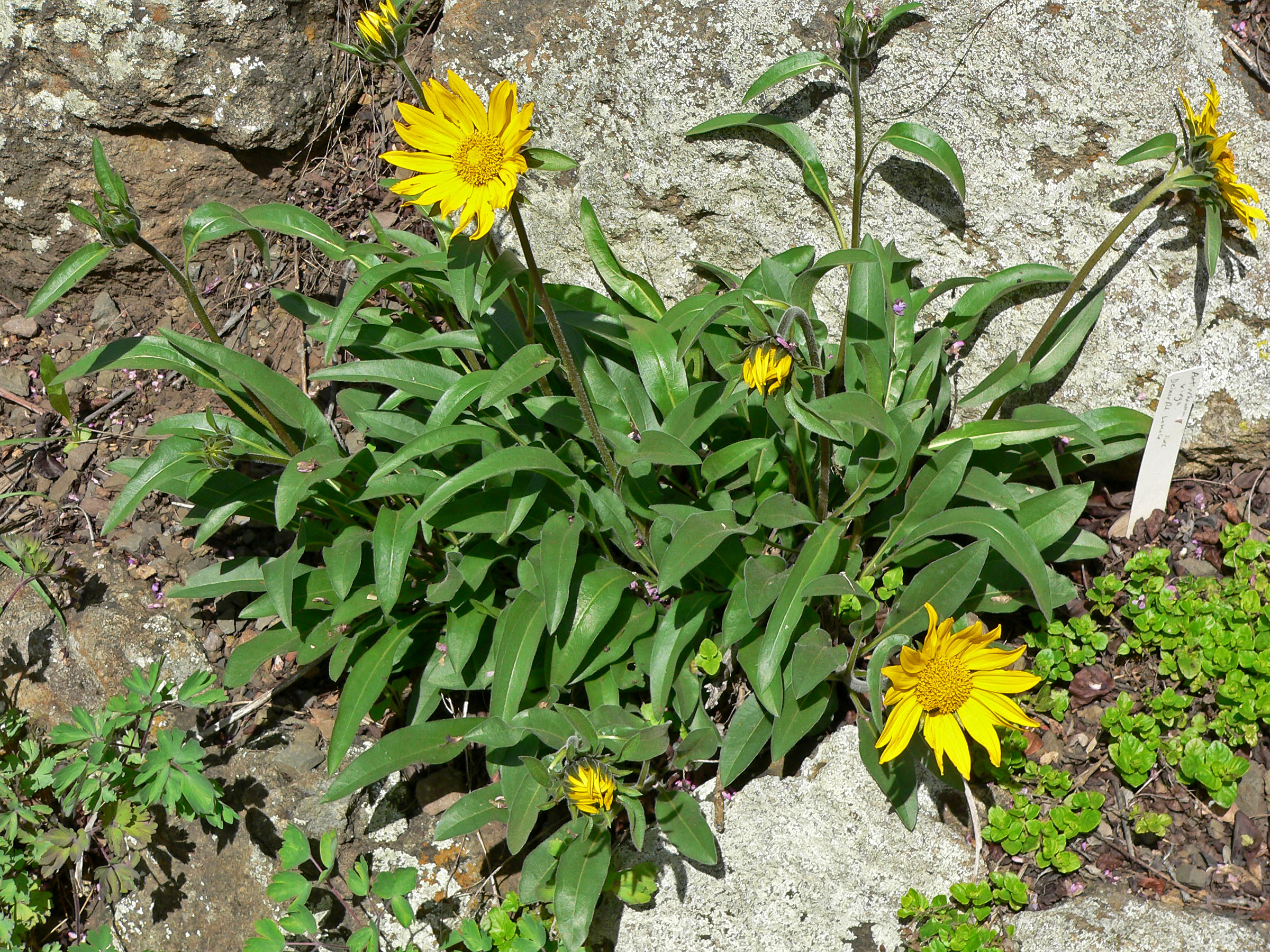

Conservation status
- Imperiled (NatureServe)

Scientific classification
- Kingdom: Plantae
- Clade: Tracheophytes
- Clade: Angiosperms
- Clade: Eudicots
- Clade: Asterids
- Order: Asterales
- Family: Asteraceae
- Genus: Helianthella
- Species: H. castanea

Binomial name
- Helianthella castanea E.Greene 1893

= Helianthella castanea =

Species of flowering plant

Helianthella castanea is a rare plant endemic to California, and is found only in the San Francisco Bay Area, mostly in the hills east of the bay, including in Mount Diablo State Park, Wildcat Canyon Regional Park, Briones Regional Park, Las Trampas Regional Wilderness, and surrounding areas. Its common names include Mount Diablo helianthella, Mount Diablo sunflower, and Diablo rockrose.

Helianthella castanea is a herbaceous plant up to 45 cm (18 inches) tall. Leaves are up to 15 cm (6 inches) long. The plant usually produces one yellow flower head per stem. Each head contains both ray flowers and disc flowers.
