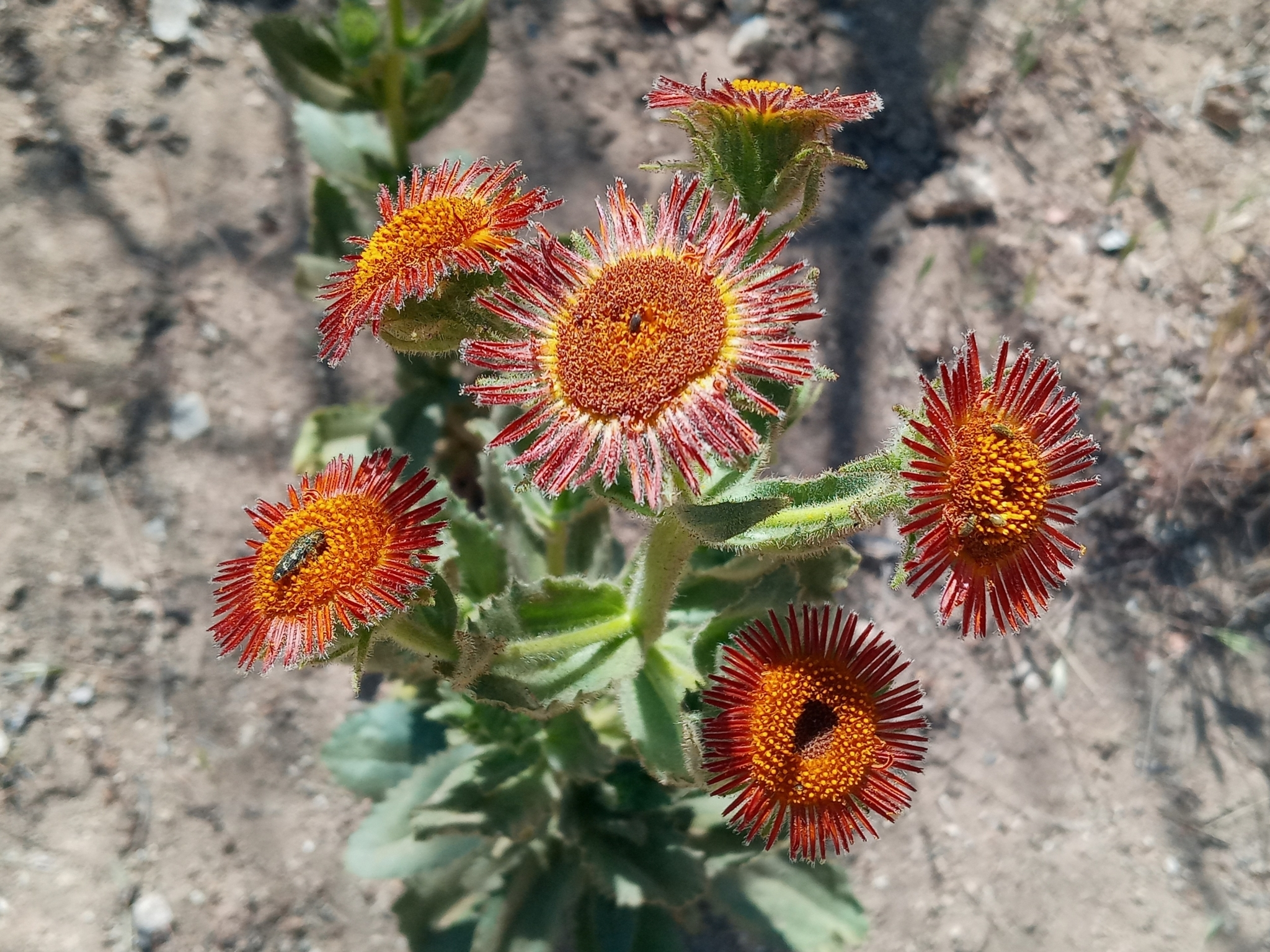

Scientific classification
- Kingdom: Plantae
- Clade: Tracheophytes
- Clade: Angiosperms
- Clade: Eudicots
- Clade: Asterids
- Order: Asterales
- Family: Asteraceae
- Genus: Hulsea
- Species: H. heterochroma

Binomial name
- Hulsea heterochroma A.Gray

= Hulsea heterochroma =

Species of flowering plant

Hulsea heterochroma, commonly known as redray alpinegold, is a species of flowering plant in the family Asteraceae.

It is native to the Southwestern United States and California. It grows in chaparral, yellow pine forests, and open habitats between 3,000–9,000 feet (910–2,740 m) in elevation.

== Description ==
Hulsea heterochroma is an annual or perennial herb growing thick, leafy green stems to heights sometimes over one meter (40 inches). The toothed leaves are 10 to 20 centimeters (4-8 inches) long. Leaves and stem are covered in glandular hairs.

The leafy inflorescence produces many flower heads also completely covered in small glandular hairs. The green, lance-shaped phyllaries are over a centimeter (0.4 inch) long. The center of the flower head is filled with many yellow disc florets, while the edge is fringed with 28–75 narrow, thready red-orange to reddish pink ray florets each up to a centimeter (0.4 inches) long.

The fruit is a hairy achene 6 to 8 millimeters (0.24-0.32 inches) long.
