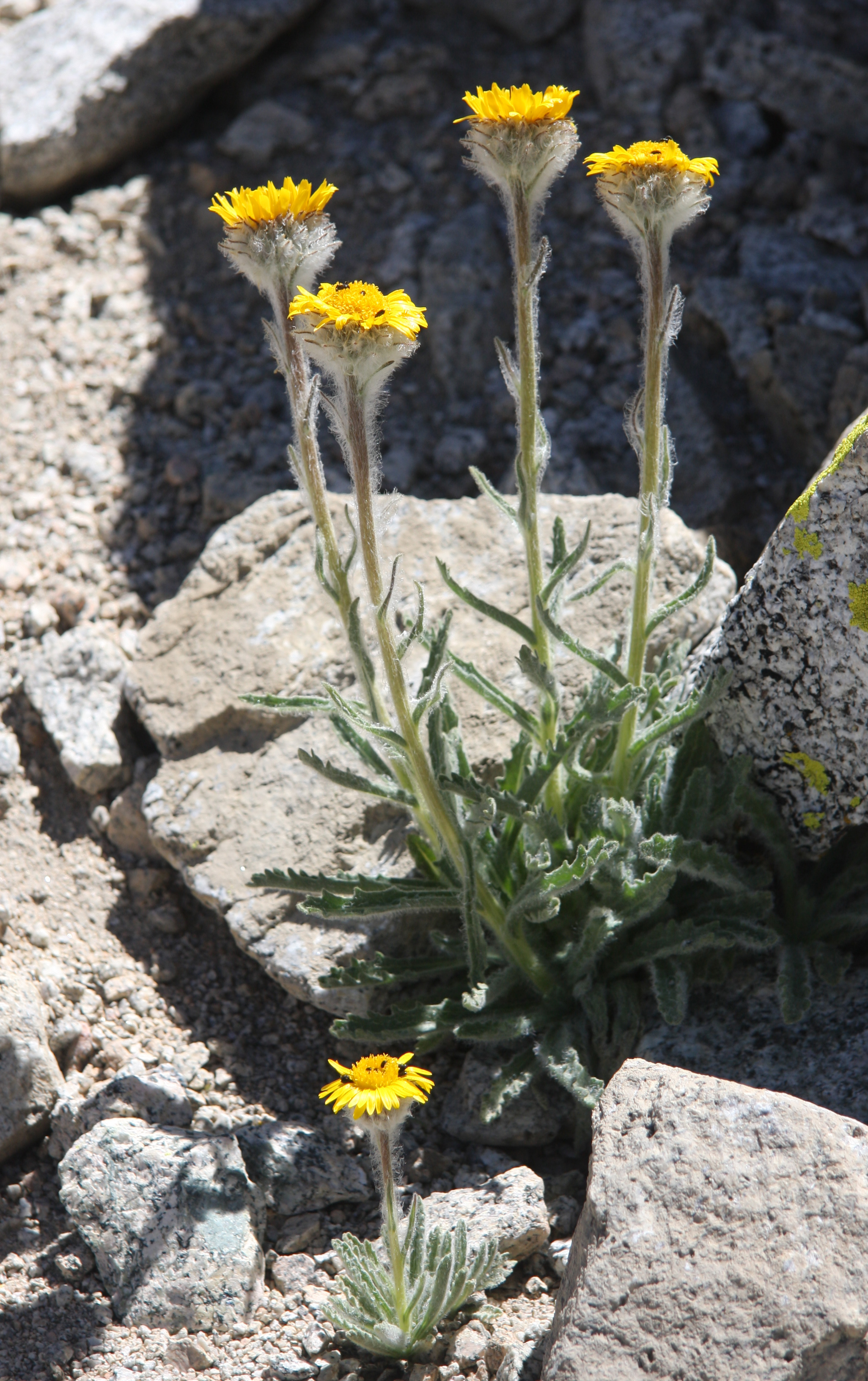
- Hulsea algida Kings Canyon National Park, California, USA

Scientific classification
- Kingdom: Plantae
- Clade: Embryophytes
- Clade: Tracheophytes
- Clade: Spermatophytes
- Clade: Angiosperms
- Clade: Eudicots
- Clade: Asterids
- Order: Asterales
- Family: Asteraceae
- Subfamily: Asteroideae
- Tribe: Madieae
- Subtribe: Hulseinae
- Genus: Hulsea; Torr. & Gray 1858

Type species
- Hulsea californica Torr. & Gray

= Hulsea =

Genus of flowering plants

Hulsea is a small genus of North American flowering plants in the family Asteraceae known commonly as alpinegold.

Alpinegolds are annual or perennial herbs native to western North America. They produce stout erect stems which may be fuzzy, hairy, or quite woolly. They are leafy, especially toward the base of the stem. At the top of the stem, they bear small daisylike flower heads, with ray florets in shades of yellow to reddish-orange around a center packed with disc florets. The fruits are generally hard and black with a pappus.

Species

- Hulsea algida - Pacific hulsea - California, Nevada, Oregon, Idaho, Wyoming, Montana
- Hulsea brevifolia - shortleaf alpinegold - California
- Hulsea californica - San Diego alpinegold, San Diego sunflower - Baja California, California (San Diego County, Riverside County)
- Hulsea heterochroma - redray alpinegold - California, Nevada, Utah, Arizona
- Hulsea mexicana - Mexican alpinegold - Baja California, San Diego County in California
- Hulsea nana - dwarf alpinegold - northern California, Oregon, Washington
- Hulsea vestita - pumice alpinegold - California, Nye County in Nevada
