= Helianthella durangensis =

Scientific classification
- Kingdom: Plantae
- Clade: Tracheophytes
- Clade: Angiosperms
- Clade: Eudicots
- Clade: Asterids
- Order: Asterales
- Family: Asteraceae
- Genus: Helianthella
- Species: H. durangensis

Binomial name
- Helianthella durangensis B.L.Turner

Species of flowering plant

Helianthella durangensis is a rare Mexican plant in the family Asteraceae, found only in the State of Durango in northern Mexico.

Helianthella durangensis is a herbaceous plant up to 35 cm (14 in) tall. Leaves are long and narrow, up to 6 cm (2.4 in) long. Each head contains both ray flowers and disc flowers.
