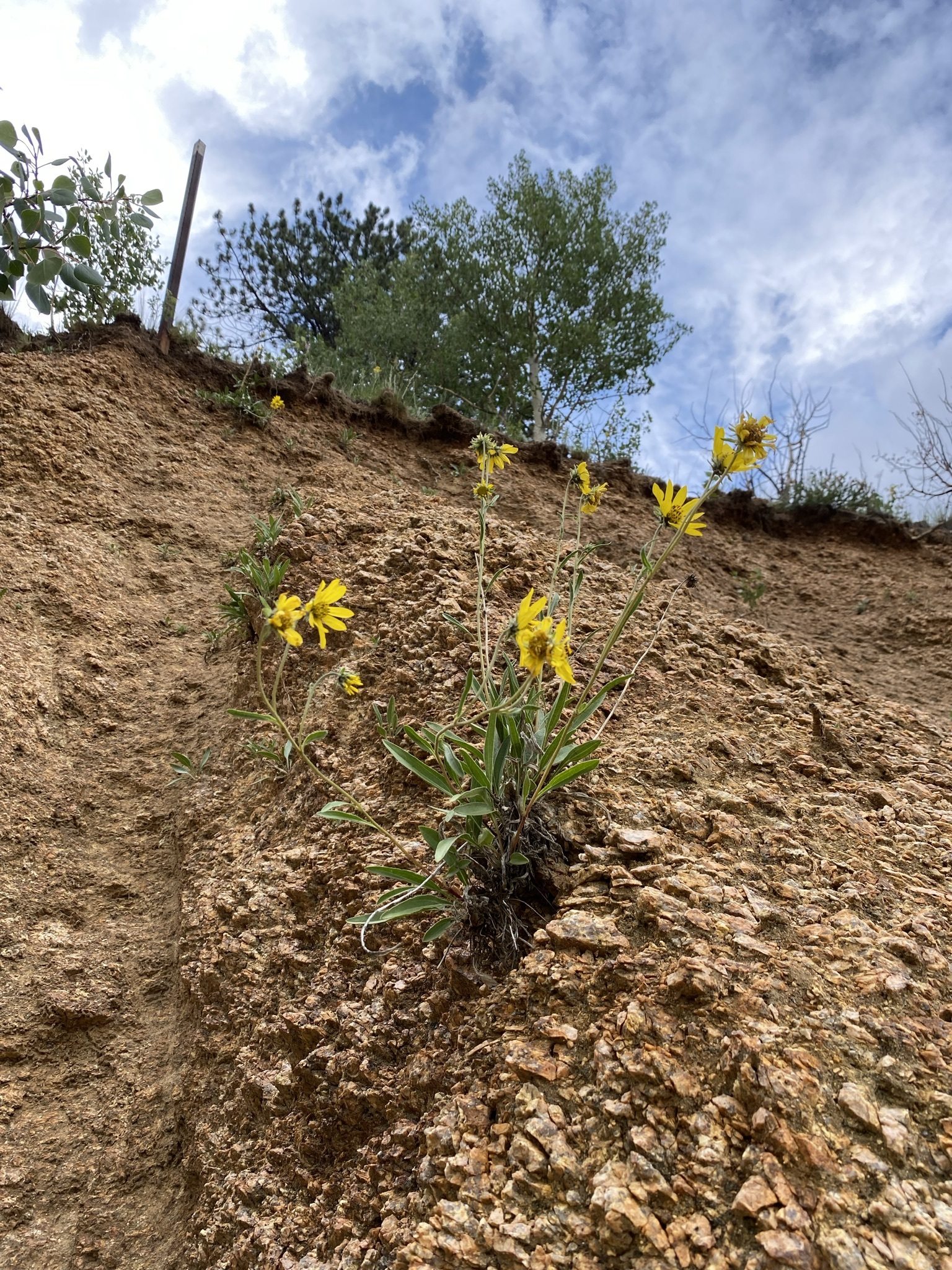

Conservation status
- Apparently Secure (NatureServe)

Scientific classification
- Kingdom: Plantae
- Clade: Tracheophytes
- Clade: Angiosperms
- Clade: Eudicots
- Clade: Asterids
- Order: Asterales
- Family: Asteraceae
- Genus: Helianthella
- Species: H. parryi

Binomial name
- Helianthella parryi A.Gray

= Helianthella parryi =

Species of flowering plant

Helianthella parryi, common name Parry's dwarf-sunflower, is a North American plant species in the family Asteraceae. It grows in the southwestern United States, in the States of Arizona, New Mexico, Colorado, and Utah.

Helianthella parryi is a herbaceous plant up to 50 cm (20 in) tall. The plant usually produces only one yellow flower heads per stem, though sometimes 2 or 3. Heads are nodding (hanging). Each head contains 8-14 yellow ray flowers surrounding numerous yellow disc flowers.
