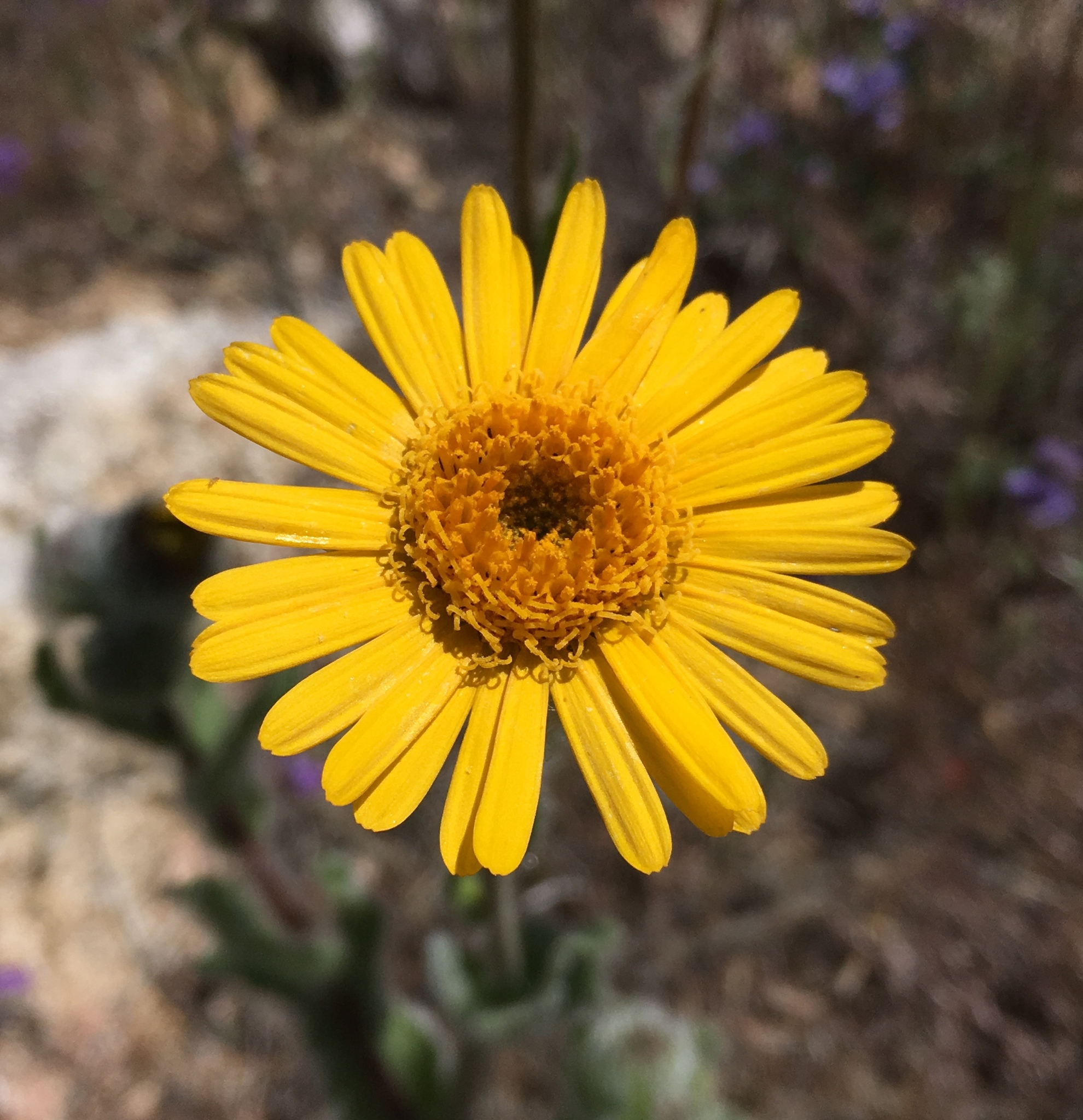

Scientific classification
- Kingdom: Plantae
- Clade: Tracheophytes
- Clade: Angiosperms
- Clade: Eudicots
- Clade: Asterids
- Order: Asterales
- Family: Asteraceae
- Genus: Hulsea
- Species: H. californica

Binomial name
- Hulsea californica Torr. & A.Gray

= Hulsea californica =

Species of flowering plant

Hulsea californica is a rare species of flowering plant in the family Asteraceae known by the common names San Diego alpinegold and San Diego sunflower. It is endemic to southern California, where it grows only in the Peninsular Ranges.

The plant grows in open areas such as forest clearings and occurs in the chaparral, especially after wildfire. Most of its known populations are in San Diego County. The main threat to this species are invasive plant species.

== Description ==
Hulsea californica is a clumpy biennial herb producing greenish-gray to reddish erect stems of 40 centimeters (16 inches) to over a meter (40 inches) in height. The stems and foliage are hairy to densely woolly with thick coats of cobwebby fibers. Plants with thicker fibers are gray in color to nearly white. The abundant leaves are lance-shaped to scoop-shaped and up to 10 centimeters (4 inches) long, mostly without teeth along the edges but sometimes wavy or coarsely lobed.

The flower head is large with woolly lance-shaped phyllaries each over a centimeter (0.4 inches) long. The center of the head is packed with a large number of tiny deep yellow disc florets. This is surrounded by 22–40 yellow ray florets, each ray up to two centimeters (0.8 inches) long.
