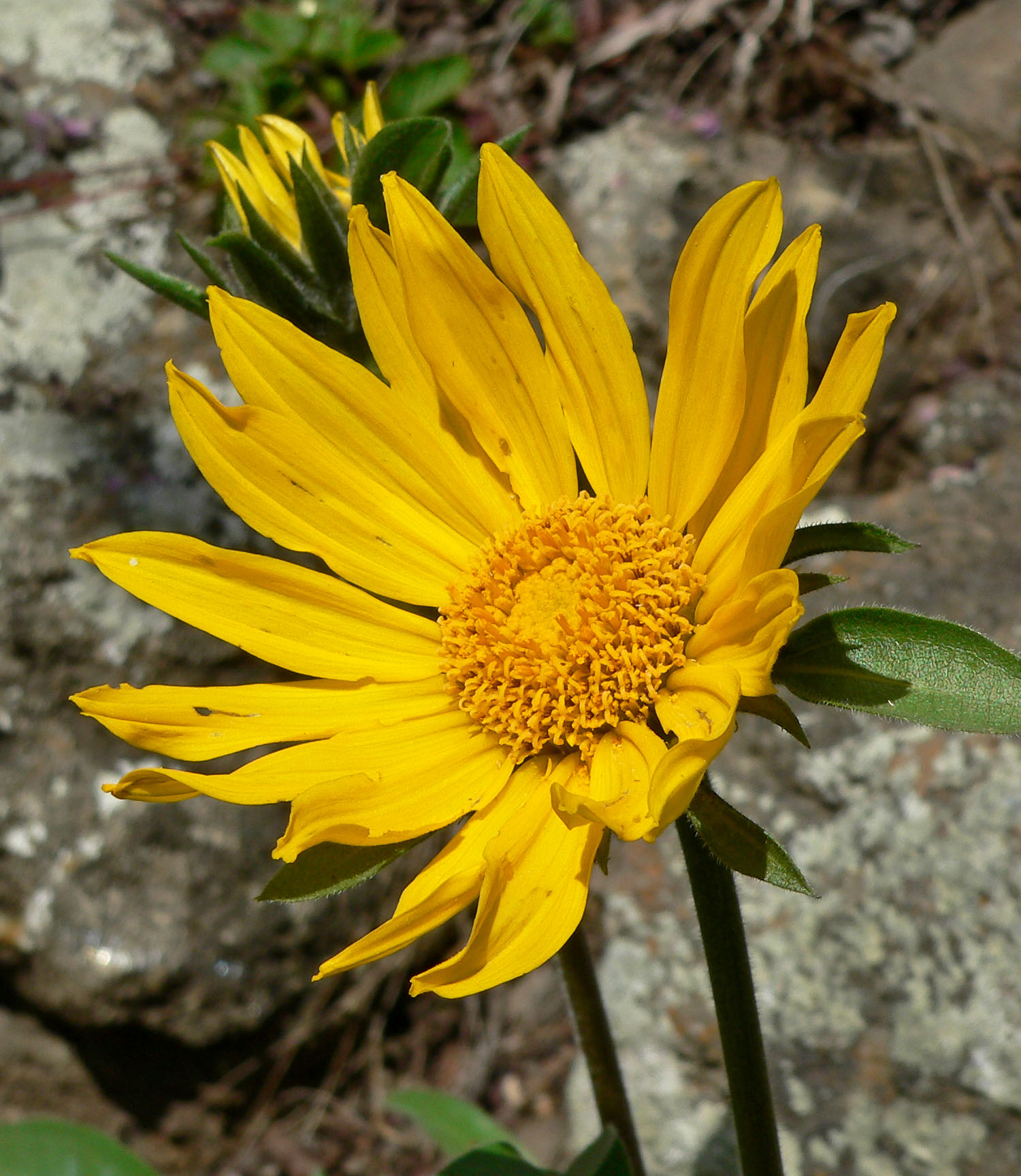
- Helianthella castanea

Scientific classification
- Kingdom: Plantae
- Clade: Embryophytes
- Clade: Tracheophytes
- Clade: Spermatophytes
- Clade: Angiosperms
- Clade: Eudicots
- Clade: Asterids
- Order: Asterales
- Family: Asteraceae
- Subfamily: Asteroideae
- Tribe: Heliantheae
- Subtribe: Enceliinae
- Genus: Helianthella; Torr. & A.Gray

Type species
- Helianthella uniflora (lectotype) (Nutt.) Torr. & A. Gray.

= Helianthella =

Genus of flowering plants

Helianthella, the little sunflower, is a genus of North American plants in the family Asteraceae.

Species

- Helianthella californica A.Gray - California, Nevada, Oregon
- Helianthella castanea Greene - San Francisco Bay region
- Helianthella ciliata S.F.Blake - Chihuahua
- Helianthella durangensis B.L.Turner - Durango
- Helianthella gypsophila B.L.Turner - Nuevo León, Coahuila
- Helianthella mexicana A.Gray - San Luis Potosí, Zacatecas, etc.
- Helianthella microcephala (A.Gray) A.Gray - Arizona, New Mexico, Colorado, Utah
- Helianthella parryi A.Gray - Arizona, New Mexico, Colorado, Utah
- Helianthella quinquenervis (Hook.) A.Gray - from Coahuila to Oregon + Montana
- Helianthella uniflora (Nutt.) Torr. & A.Gray - from New Mexico to British Columbia
