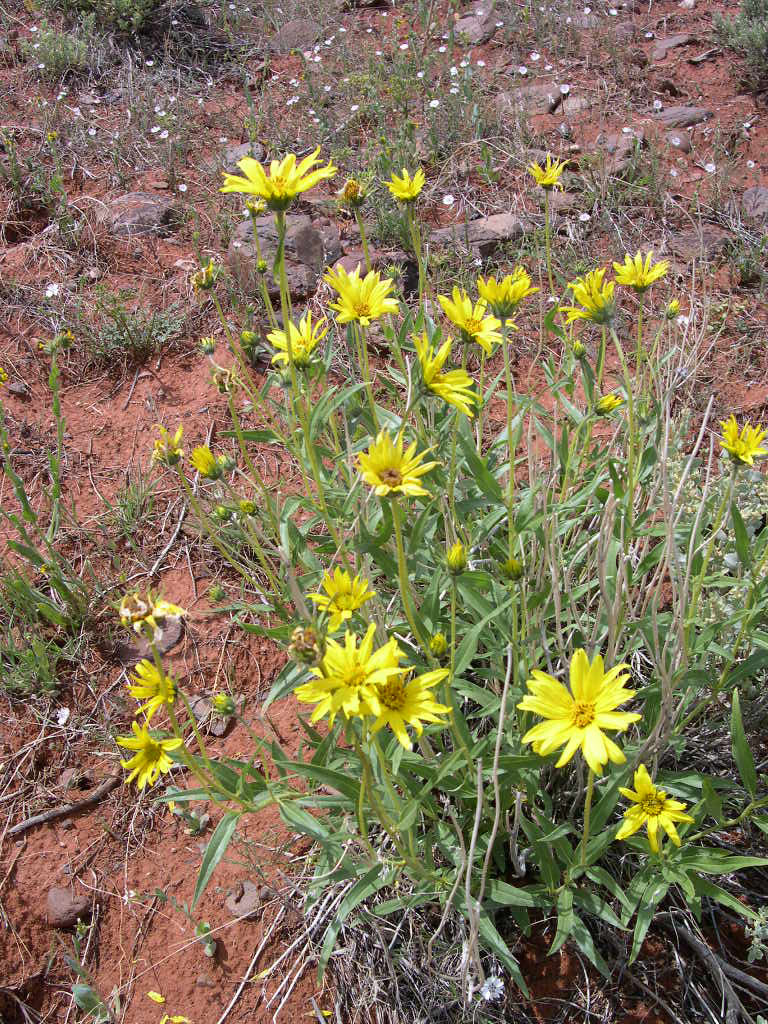

Scientific classification
- Kingdom: Plantae
- Clade: Tracheophytes
- Clade: Angiosperms
- Clade: Eudicots
- Clade: Asterids
- Order: Asterales
- Family: Asteraceae
- Tribe: Heliantheae
- Genus: Helianthus
- Species: H. cusickii

Binomial name
- Helianthus cusickii Gray

= Helianthus cusickii =

Species of sunflower

Helianthus cusickii is a species of sunflower known by the common names Cusick's sunflower and turniproot sunflower. It is native to the western United States from Washington, Oregon, Idaho, northern California, and northwestern Nevada.

Helianthus cusickii grows in mountain forests and foothills. This wildflower is a perennial up to 120 cm (4 feet) tall, growing from a thick, fleshy taproot. The lance-shaped leaves reach 15 centimeters (6 inches) in length, and the stem and foliage are often covered in long hairs. The flower heads have a base of long, hairy green phyllaries. The center of the head is filled with at least 40 yellow disc florets surrounded by 12–16 ray florets.

Some Plateau Indian tribes used the roots to treat erectile dysfunction, wasting, and tuberculosis.
