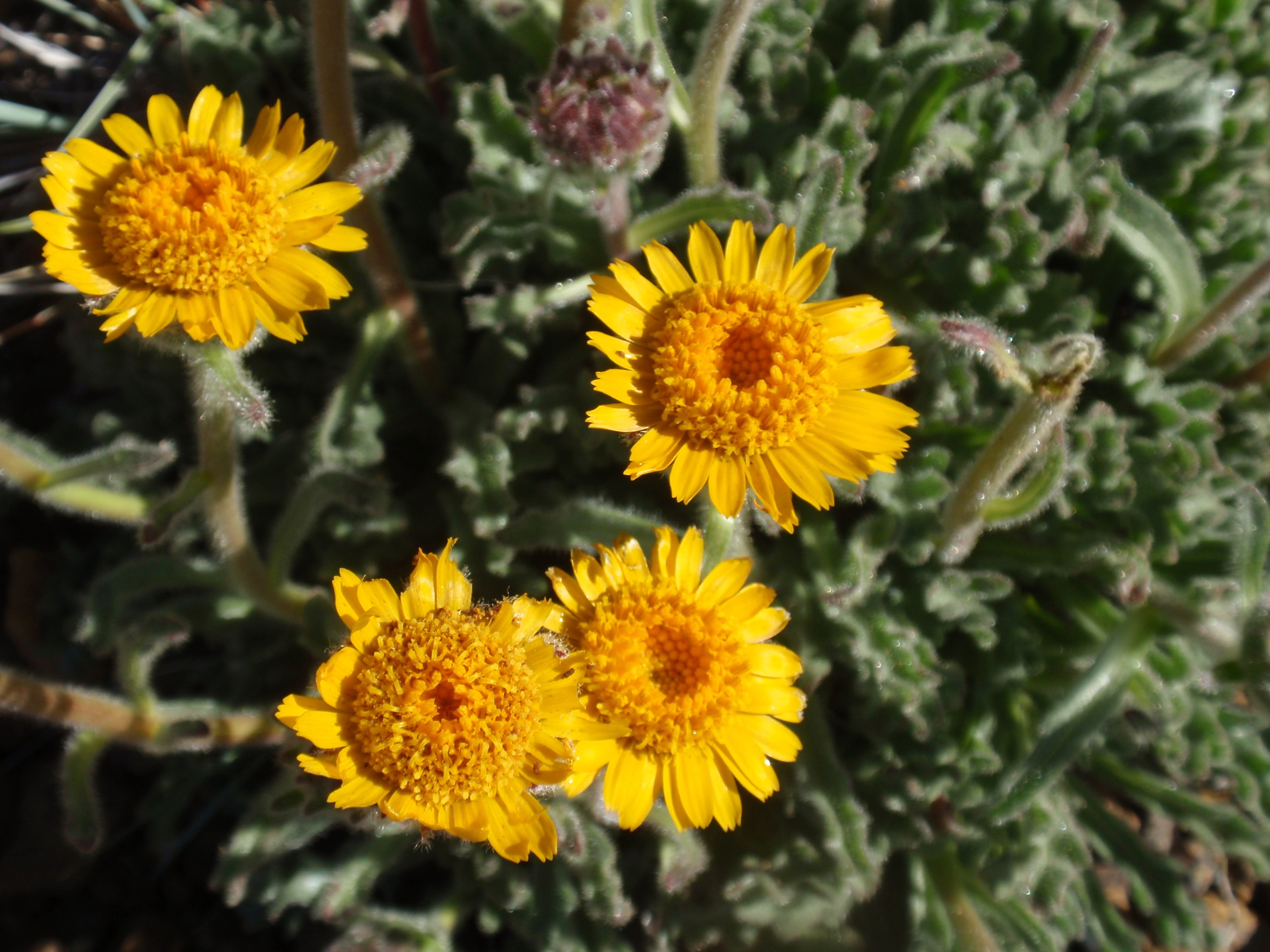

Scientific classification
- Kingdom: Plantae
- Clade: Tracheophytes
- Clade: Angiosperms
- Clade: Eudicots
- Clade: Asterids
- Order: Asterales
- Family: Asteraceae
- Genus: Hulsea
- Species: H. nana

Binomial name
- Hulsea nana A.Gray

Synonyms
- Hulsea larseni (A.Gray) Rydb.; Hulsea larsenii (A.Gray) Rydb.; Hulsea nana var. larsenii A.Gray; Hulsea vulcanica Gand.

= Hulsea nana =

Species of flowering plant

Hulsea nana is a North American species of flowering plant in the family Asteraceae known by the common name dwarf alpinegold. It is native to the western United States from Washington, Oregon, and far northern California.

The plant grows in the talus of volcanic mountains and plateaus.

== Description ==
Hulsea nana is a diminutive perennial herb producing clumps of hairy foliage and stout stems rarely more than 20 centimeters (6 inches) tall. The leaves are 2 to 6 centimeters (0.4-2.4 inches) long and have lobed edges and many glandular hairs.

The stem usually bears a single robust flower head with layers of hairy to woolly phyllaries. The center of the head is packed with golden disc florets surrounded by a circumference lined with golden ray florets each about a centimeter (0.4 inches) long.
