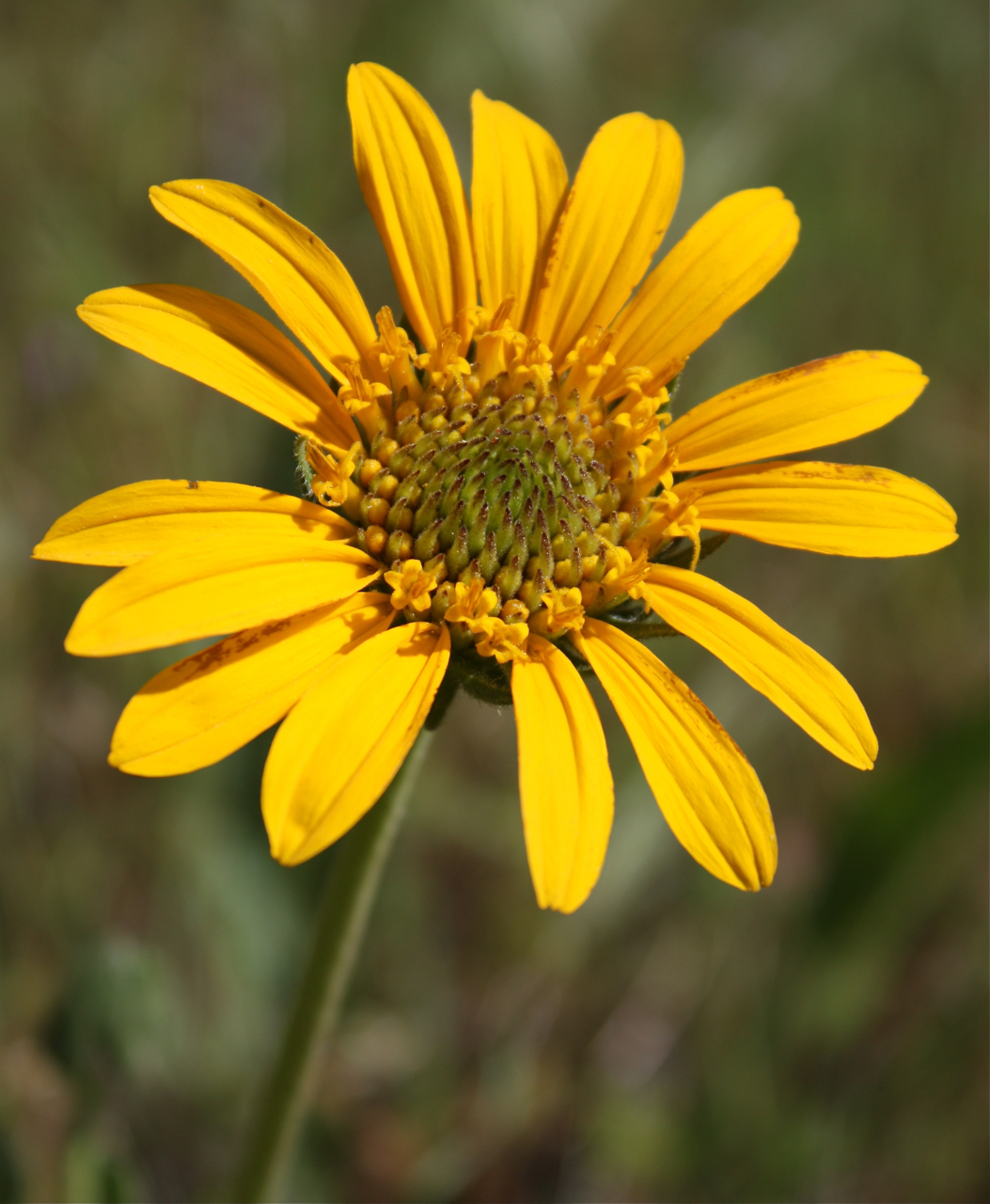

Scientific classification
- Kingdom: Plantae
- Clade: Tracheophytes
- Clade: Angiosperms
- Clade: Eudicots
- Clade: Asterids
- Order: Asterales
- Family: Asteraceae
- Genus: Helianthella
- Species: H. californica

Binomial name
- Helianthella californica A.Gray

Synonyms
- Helianthella nevadensis Greene, syn of subsp. nevadensis

= Helianthella californica =

Species of flowering plant

Helianthella californica is a species of flowering plant in the family Asteraceae known by the common name California helianthella. This wildflower is native to the mountains of California, northwestern Nevada, and southwestern Oregon.

Helianthella californica is a taprooted perennial herb producing erect stems up to about 60 centimeters (2 feet) tall. The many lance-shaped leaves are up to 4 centimeters (1.6 inches) wide and up to 26 cm (11 inches) long, smooth or slightly toothed along the edges. The inflorescence holds one or more sunflower-like flower heads. Each head has a center of golden disc florets with purple or reddish parts, and a fringe of yellow ray florets one or two centimeters (0.4-0.8 inches) long.

Subspecies

- Helianthella californica subsp. californica - Coast Ranges in area near San Francisco Bay plus a few populations in northern Sierra Nevada Foothills
- Helianthella californica subsp. nevadensis (Greene) W.A.Weber - Sierra Nevada + Cascades in California, Nevada, + Oregon
- Helianthella californica subsp. shastensis (W.A.Weber) W.A.Weber - southern Cascades plus Shasta-Trinity area

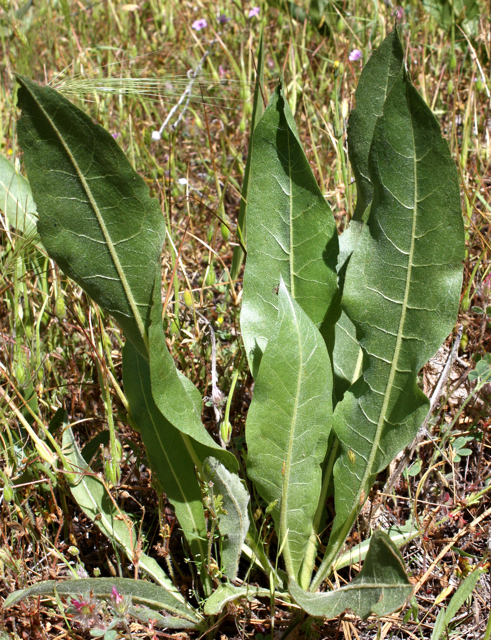
Leaves
