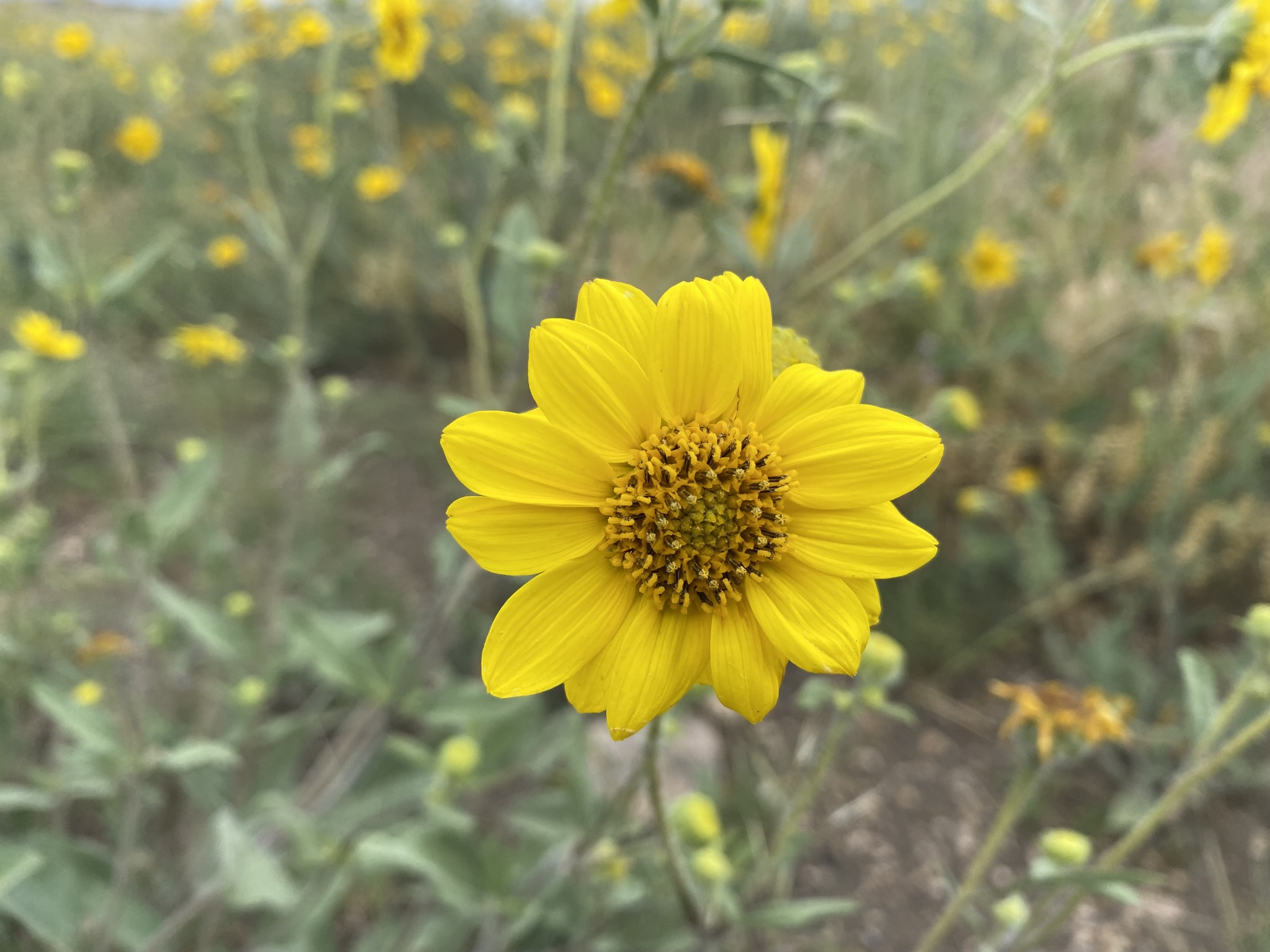

Conservation status
- Apparently Secure (NatureServe)

Scientific classification
- Kingdom: Plantae
- Clade: Embryophytes
- Clade: Tracheophytes
- Clade: Spermatophytes
- Clade: Angiosperms
- Clade: Eudicots
- Clade: Asterids
- Order: Asterales
- Family: Asteraceae
- Tribe: Heliantheae
- Genus: Helianthus
- Species: H. pumilus

Binomial name
- Helianthus pumilus Nutt. 1841

= Helianthus pumilus =

Species of sunflower

Helianthus pumilus is a North American species of sunflower known by the common name little sunflower or bush sunflower. It is found in the western United States, primarily the Rocky Mountain region of Montana, Wyoming, and Colorado, with a few isolated populations in Utah and Idaho.

Helianthus pumilus grows on dry rocky soil in the mountains and nearby plains. It is a perennial herb up to 100 cm (40 inches) tall. One plant usually produces 1–6 flower heads, each containing 8–13 yellow ray florets surrounding 30 or more yellow or brown disc florets.
