= Rotundifolius =

Rotundifolius m., Rotundifolia f. and Rotundifolium (Latin for round-leaved) may refer to several plant species including:

- Berberis rotundifolia, a barberry species
- Campanula rotundifolia, the harebell
- Combretum rotundifolium, the monkey brush, a plant species found in South America
- Cissus rotundifolia, also known as Venezuelan treebine, Arabian wax leaf, Peruvian grape ivy
- Commidendrum rotundifolium, the bastard gumwood, a tree species endemic to the island of Saint Helena
- Drosera rotundifolia, the round-leaved sundew or the common sundew, a sundew species
- Eupatorium rotundifolium
- Lavandula rotundifolia, a lavender species found in Cape Verde
- Pellaea rotundifolia, the button fern, a popular house plant native to New Zealand
- Plectranthus rotundifolius
- Ribes rotundifolium
- Saribus rotundifolius
- Smilax rotundifolia
- Viola rotundifolia, eastern roundleaf yellow violet or early yellow violet, a violet species
- Vitis rotundifolia, the muscadine, a grapevine species

== Synonyms ==
- Abronia rotundifolia, synonym of Abronia umbellata
- Alnus rotundifolia, synonym of Alnus cordata
- Amaryllis rotundifolia, synonym of Proiphys amboinensis
- Amelanchier rotundifolia, synonym of Amelanchier ovalis
- Ancylobothrys rotundifolia, synonym of Ancylobothrys petersiana
- Correa rotundifolia, synonym of Correa alba
- Corypha rotundifolia, synonym of Saribus rotundifolius
- Galax rotundifolia, synonym of Galax urceolata
- Germanea rotundifolia, synonym of Plectranthus rotundifolius
- Grossularia rotundifolia, synonym of Ribes rotundifolium
- Livistona rotundifolia, synonym of Saribus rotundifolius
- Mentha rotundifolia, synonym of Mentha suaveolens, the apple mint or the pineapple mint
- Olea rotundifolia, synonym of Osmanthus heterophyllus
- Quercus rotundifolia, synonym of Quercus ilex, an oak species
- Uncasia rotundifolia, synonym of Eupatorium rotundifolium
- Utricularia rotundifolia, synonym of Utricularia dichotoma
