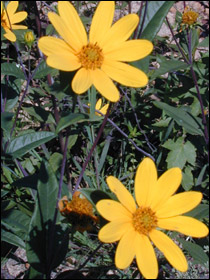

Conservation status
- Vulnerable (NatureServe)

Scientific classification
- Kingdom: Plantae
- Clade: Tracheophytes
- Clade: Angiosperms
- Clade: Eudicots
- Clade: Asterids
- Order: Asterales
- Family: Asteraceae
- Genus: Helianthus
- Species: H. eggertii

Binomial name
- Helianthus eggertii Small

= Helianthus eggertii =

Species of sunflower

Helianthus eggertii, known as Eggert's sunflower, is a North American species of flowering plants in the family Asteraceae. It is native to Tennessee, Kentucky, South Carolina, and Alabama. It is best known as one of the few plants to have been delisted under the Endangered Species Act because of the species' recovery. It was described by John Kunkel Small in 1903.

== Description ==
Helianthus eggertii may grow to over 2 m (6 ft 7 in) tall, with erect, hairless stems. The leaves are borne on the stem, mostly in opposite pairs. These leaves are lanceolate to ovate, 70–165 mm (2.8–6.5 in) long by 15–35 mm (0.59–1.38 in) wide, narrowing towards the base. Each stem carries 1–5 flower heads, each on a peduncle 1–4 cm (0.39–1.57 in) long. Each flower head is 10–25 mm (0.39–0.98 in) in diameter, with 30–38 lanceolate phyllaries around the base. The flower head is hemispherical, and contains 10–18 yellow ray florets surrounding over 70 disc florets.

Helianthus eggertii is very similar to the related species H. strumosus and H. laevigatus. It differs from those species in that its stems are distinctively blue-colored, and its leaves have only one vein, rather than three veins, as is typical for the genus.

== Distribution and ecology ==
Helianthus eggertii is only found in the Interior Low Plateaus area of Tennessee, Kentucky, and Alabama, where it lives in barren forest openings.

== Conservation ==
Helianthus eggertii was originally listed as an endangered species by the US federal government in 1997 under the Endangered Species Act. A number of conservation measures were therefore instituted to protect the species. The mowing of roadside verges that contain H. eggertii is delayed until after November 15 each year to allow the plant to set seed before it is mown. Utility companies manage the woody brush under their power lines by mechanical pruning, rather than using herbicides, and this is also carried out late in the season. In 2005, H eggertii was delisted after research showed that although there were few populations of H. eggertii, they were increasing in size. As of April 2015, H. eggertii is one of only four plant species to have been delisted under the Endangered Species Act as a result of the species' recovery; the others are Potentilla robbinsiana (Robbins' cinquefoil), Erigeron maguirei (Maguire daisy), and Echinacea tennesseensis (Tennessee purple coneflower).

== Taxonomy ==
Helianthus eggertii was first described by John Kunkel Small in 1903 in his Flora of the Southeastern United States. The type locality was given as "On rocky hills, Dickson County, Tennessee", and the specific epithet commemorated Henry Eggert, who had collected the plant in 1897.
