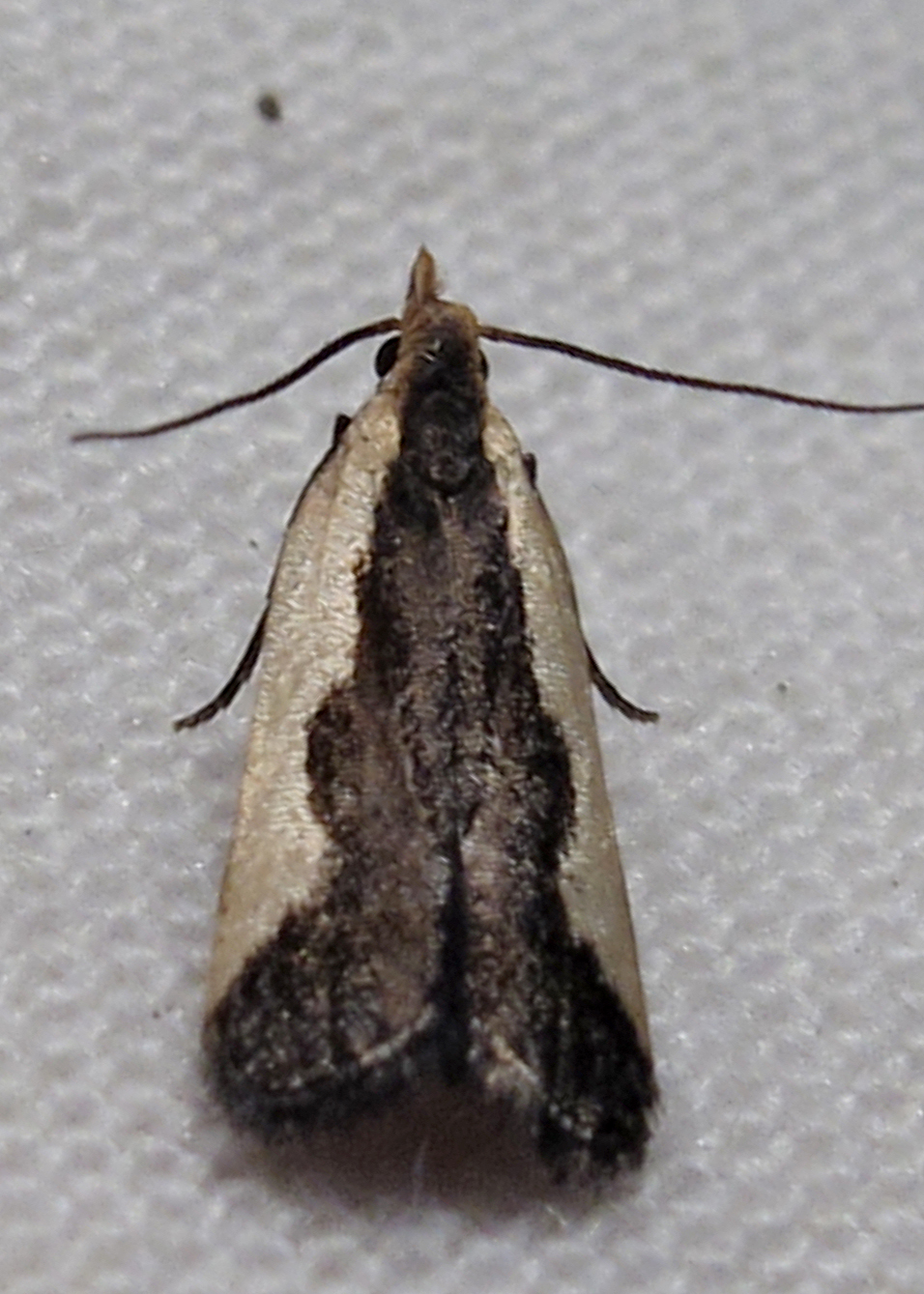

Scientific classification
- Kingdom: Animalia
- Phylum: Arthropoda
- Clade: Pancrustacea
- Class: Insecta
- Order: Lepidoptera
- Family: Gelechiidae
- Genus: Dichomeris
- Species: D. aleatrix

Binomial name
- Dichomeris aleatrix Hodges, 1986

= Dichomeris aleatrix =

Buffy dichomeris moth

Species of moth

Dichomeris aleatrix, the buffy dichomeris moth, is a moth in the family Gelechiidae. It was described by Ronald W. Hodges in 1986. It is found in North America, where it has been recorded from southern Ontario south to Tennessee and north to Illinois.

The length of the forewings is about 9 mm. Adults have been recorded on wing from April to July and in September.

The larvae feed on Helianthus species, Helianthus hirsutus and Helianthus rigidus.
