= Helianthus praetermissus =

Scientific classification
- Kingdom: Plantae
- Clade: Tracheophytes
- Clade: Angiosperms
- Clade: Eudicots
- Clade: Asterids
- Order: Asterales
- Family: Asteraceae
- Tribe: Heliantheae
- Genus: Helianthus
- Species: H. praetermissus

Binomial name
- Helianthus praetermissus E.Watson

Species of sunflower

Helianthus praetermissus is a rare and probably extinct North American species of sunflower, with the common names New Mexico sunflower and lost sunflower. It is known from only one specimen collected in 1851 in Cibola County in western New Mexico, and not seen since.

Helianthus praetermissus is (was?) an annual herb with a slender, unbranching stem 90 cm (3 feet) tall. It has (had) a single flower head with yellow ray florets surrounding red disc florets.
