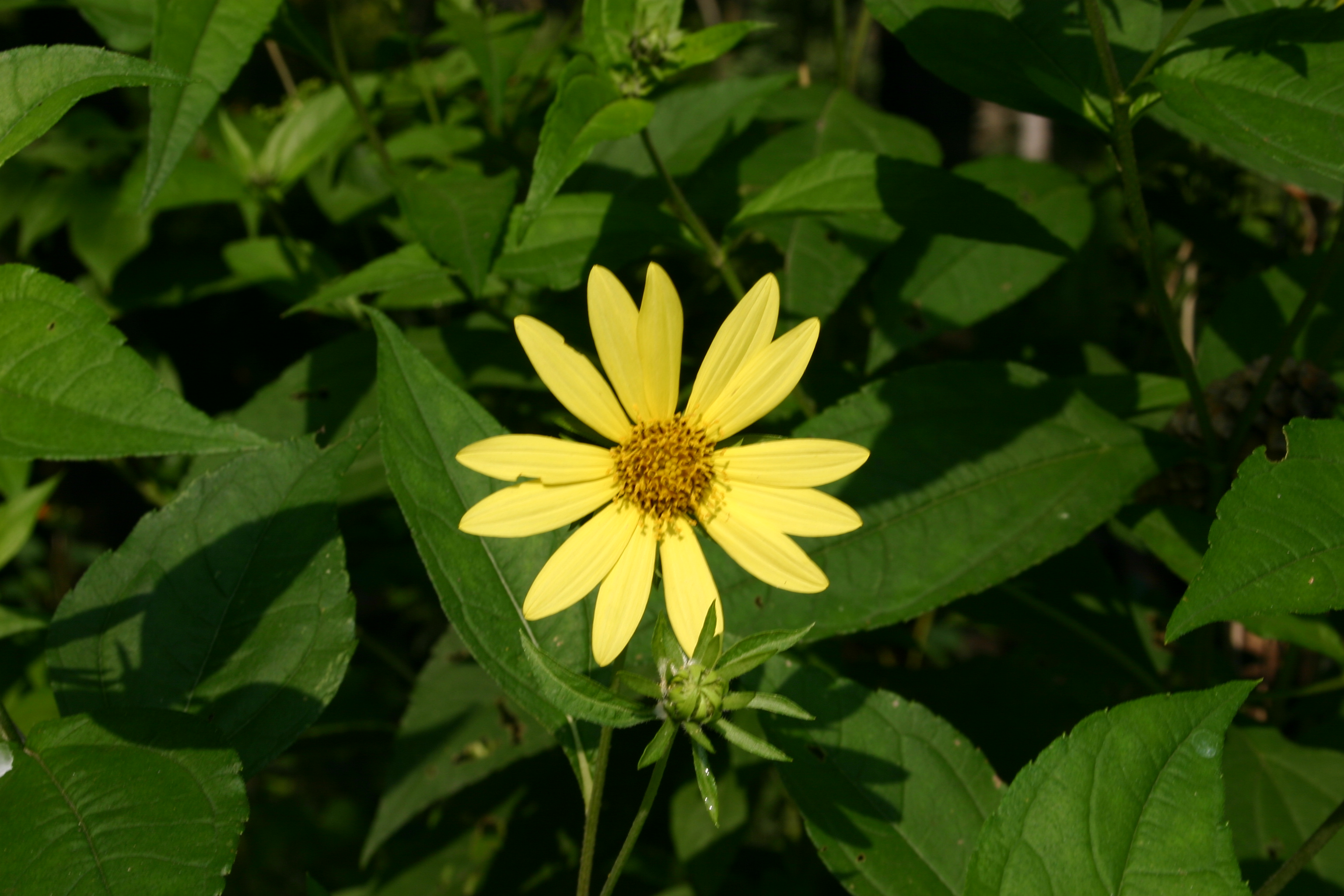
- Head

Scientific classification
- Kingdom: Plantae
- Clade: Tracheophytes
- Clade: Angiosperms
- Clade: Eudicots
- Clade: Asterids
- Order: Asterales
- Family: Asteraceae
- Tribe: Heliantheae
- Genus: Helianthus
- Species: H. × laetiflorus

Binomial name
- Helianthus × laetiflorus Pers. 1807

Synonyms
- Helianthus laetiflorus Pers.; Helianthus severus E.Watson; Helianthus superbus E.Watson; Helianthus tricuspis Elliott

= Helianthus × laetiflorus =

Cheerful sunflower

Species of sunflower

Helianthus × laetiflorus, the cheerful sunflower or perennial sunflower, is a plant in the family of Asteraceae. It is widespread in scattered locations across much of Canada from Newfoundland to British Columbia, and the central and eastern United States as far south as Texas and Georgia. This species is also commonly cultivated and may escape cultivation and be found in areas outside of its core range.

== Description ==
Helianthus × laetiflorus is a herbaceous plant with alternate, simple leaves, on green stems. The flowers are yellow, borne in late summer. This species is generally considered to be of hybrid origin, with the two parental species being Helianthus tuberosus and Helianthus pauciflorus.
