= Eurycles =

Eurycles may refer to:

- Proiphys, a genus of herbaceous, perennial and bulbous plants, a.k.a. Eurycles, in the family Amaryllidaceae
- Eurycles of Athens, ventriloquist prophet (ca. 431–404 BCE)
- Caius Iulius Eurycles, a.k.a. Eurycles of Sparta, "Λακεδαιμονίων ηγεμόνα" (ruler of Spartans), a benefactor of Greek cities, and founder of the family of the Euryclids (1st century BCE)
