= Wild sage =

Wild sage is a common name for several plants and may refer to:

- Lantana camara – Spanish flag
- Salvia, a genus of plants commonly called "sage"
  - Salvia nemorosa – woodland sage
  - Salvia urticifolia – nettleleaf sage
  - Salvia verbenaca – clary sage
- Artemisia, a genus of plants including some called "sage" or "sagebrush"
