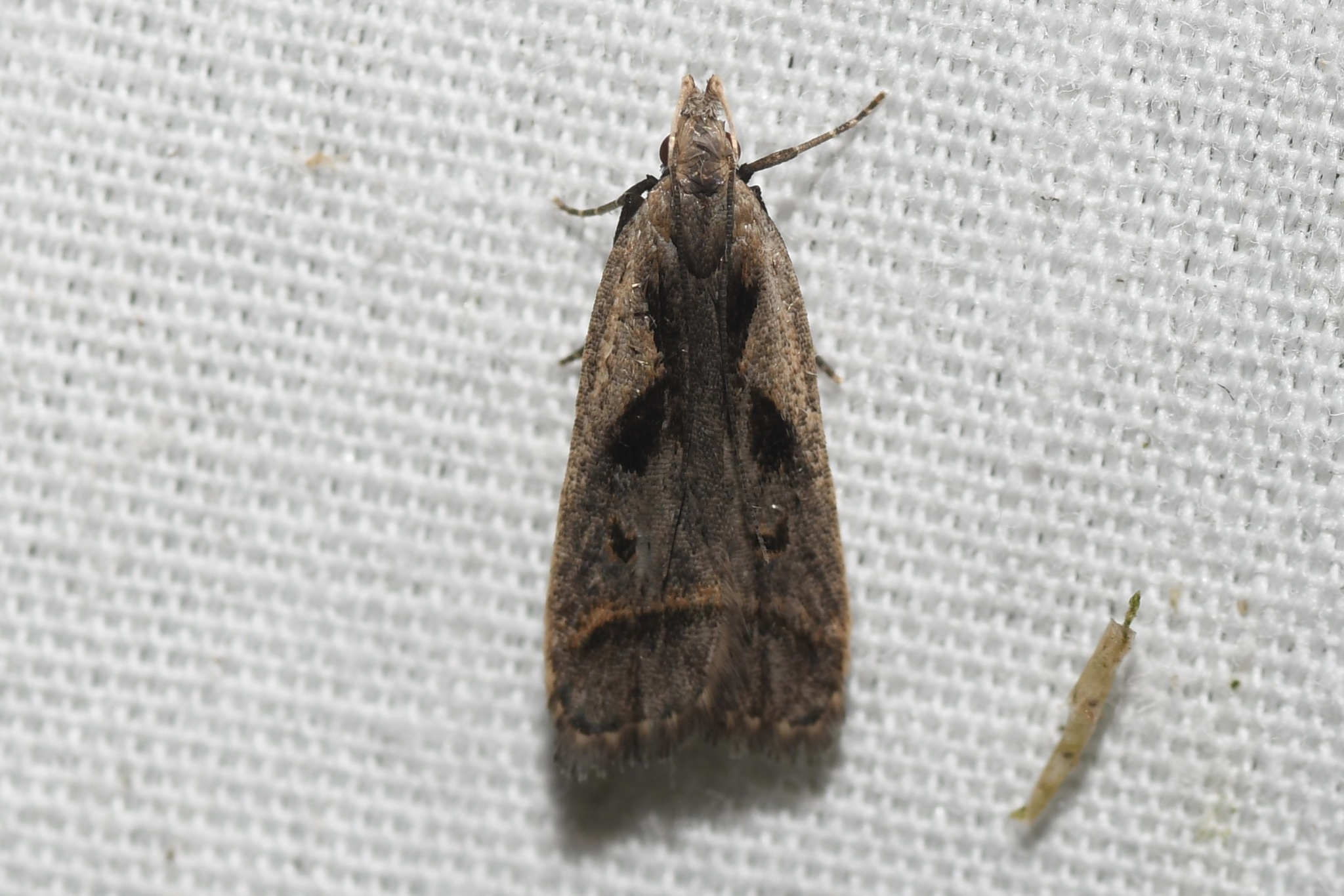

Scientific classification
- Kingdom: Animalia
- Phylum: Arthropoda
- Clade: Pancrustacea
- Class: Insecta
- Order: Lepidoptera
- Family: Gelechiidae
- Genus: Dichomeris
- Species: D. vindex

Binomial name
- Dichomeris vindex Hodges, 1986

= Dichomeris vindex =

Species of moth

Dichomeris vindex is a species of moth in the family Gelechiidae. It was first described by Ronald W. Hodges in 1986. It is found in North America, where it has been recorded from Manitoba to New Brunswick, south to Florida, west to Louisiana and Oklahoma.

The larvae feed on Helianthus hirsutus.
