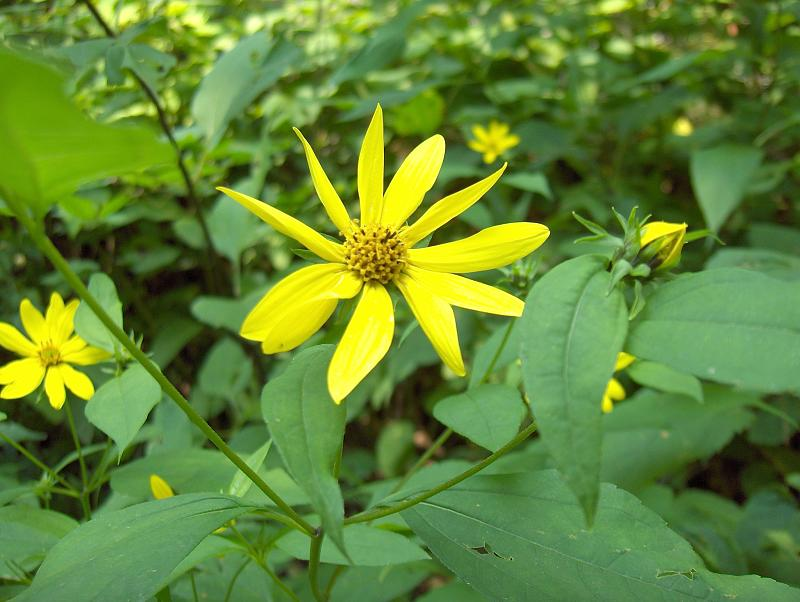

Conservation status
- Secure (NatureServe)

Scientific classification
- Kingdom: Plantae
- Clade: Tracheophytes
- Clade: Angiosperms
- Clade: Eudicots
- Clade: Asterids
- Order: Asterales
- Family: Asteraceae
- Tribe: Heliantheae
- Genus: Helianthus
- Species: H. strumosus

Binomial name
- Helianthus strumosus L.

Synonyms
- Synonymy: Helianthus chartaceus E.Watson; Helianthus decapetalus Darl.; Helianthus macrophyllus Willd.

= Helianthus strumosus =

Species of sunflower

Helianthus strumosus, the pale-leaf woodland sunflower, is a species of sunflower native to North America east of the Great Plains and is in the family Asteraceae. It is a native perennial sunflower that resembles other members of this family including the Pale Sunflower (H. decapetalus), Woodland Sunflower (H. divaricatus), Hispid Sunflower (H. hirsutus), and Jerusalem Artichoke (H. tuberosus). Pale-leaf sunflowers can be found in a diverse range of habitats including woodland areas, prairies, and meadows, providing that these habitats have access to partial sun.

== Description ==
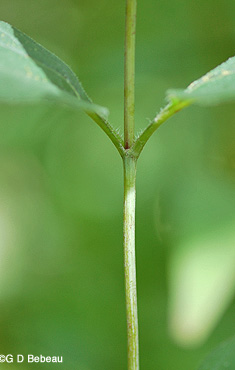
Helianthus strumosus definitively smooth stem

Growing from a rhizomatous root system, H. strumosus grows from 3 to 8 ft (0.91 to 2.44 m) in height. The pale-leaf sunflower can be difficult to distinguish since it is the most variable of the sunflowers. Some distinguishing features include the petioles, leaves, and stem. The petioles are 1 in (25 mm) in length. The leaves tend to be thick and more narrow than other species. The leaves are white underneath. H. strumosus also has a definitively smooth stem. The flower head of H. strumosus has a yellow center surrounded by a variable (usually 8-20) number of yellow ray florets.

== Distribution ==
Helianthus strumosus is a widely distributed in North America. It is found in the central and eastern United States, and southeastern parts of Canada. It is found more regularly in non-wetland areas, although it can occur in wetlands. The woodland sunflower is normally found in moist to moderately moist and sandy to loamy sandy areas. H. strumosus grows in natural, disturbed, and man-made habitats. The population can quickly become dense. These flowers must go through a minimum 30 day cold stratification before they are able to germinate.

== Pathogens ==
Helianthus strumosus has been known to be attacked by the pyrenomycetous fungus Gibberidea heliopsis. This fungus attacks not only various species of the Heliantheae tribe, but also within the Astereae tribes. The fungus has been found in the southern parts of Wisconsin with H. strumosus being one of the fungus primary target. The Gibberidea disease is most recognized on H. strumosus with black lesions running along the side or encircling the stem of the flower. Another distinguishing feature of the disease are papillate surface of mature lesions that can be seen with a hand lens since the fungal papillae breaks through or replaces the epidermis. The first symptoms of the disease are seen around late May and occur on the sides of young leaf blades.

== Ecology ==
Helianthus strumosus is insect pollinated and is recorded to have been visited in northern Florida by Halictus poeyi, H. ligatus, Lasioglossum pectorale, and Paranthidium jugatorium.

== Uses ==
The roots of H. strumosus are one of the only edible parts of the plant. They can be boiled down to make a liquor that has been used to treat adults and children with worms. The roots can also be used to make an infusion to help with lung related problems. Seeds from this sunflower can be used to make an oil for cooking and soap making.
