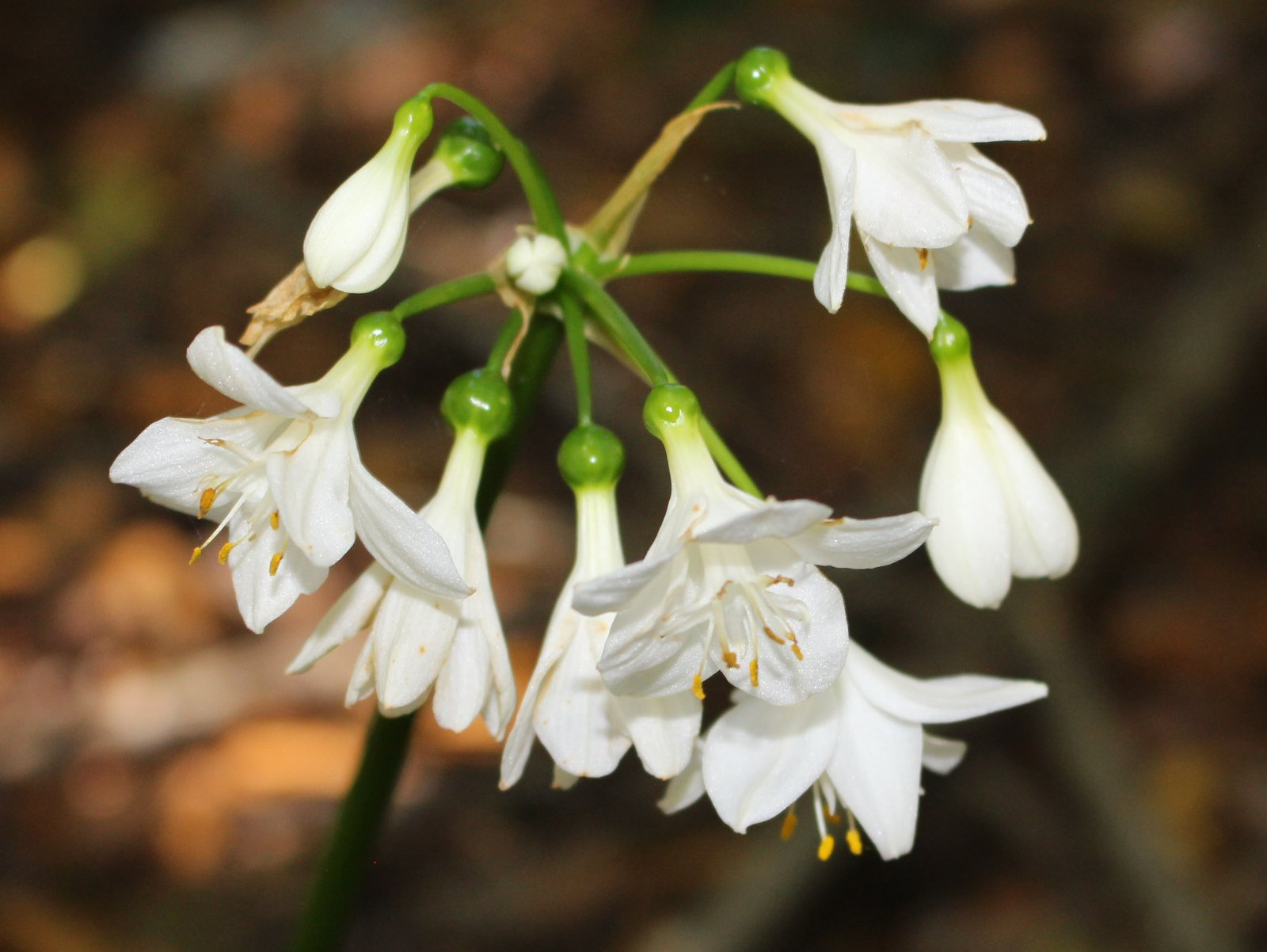

Scientific classification
- Kingdom: Plantae
- Clade: Tracheophytes
- Clade: Angiosperms
- Clade: Monocots
- Order: Asparagales
- Family: Amaryllidaceae
- Subfamily: Amaryllidoideae
- Genus: Proiphys
- Species: P. cunninghamii

Binomial name
- Proiphys cunninghamii (W.T.Aiton ex Lindl.) Mabb.

Synonyms
- Eurycles cunninghamii W.T.Aiton ex Lindl.

= Proiphys cunninghamii =

Moreton Bay lily

Species of flowering plant

Proiphys cunninghamii, the Moreton Bay lily, is a species of herb with a bulb to 5 cm in diameter. The habitat is rainforest and their margins, in eastern Australia. Flowering occurs around November to December. Normal seed development of this species has not been observed.
