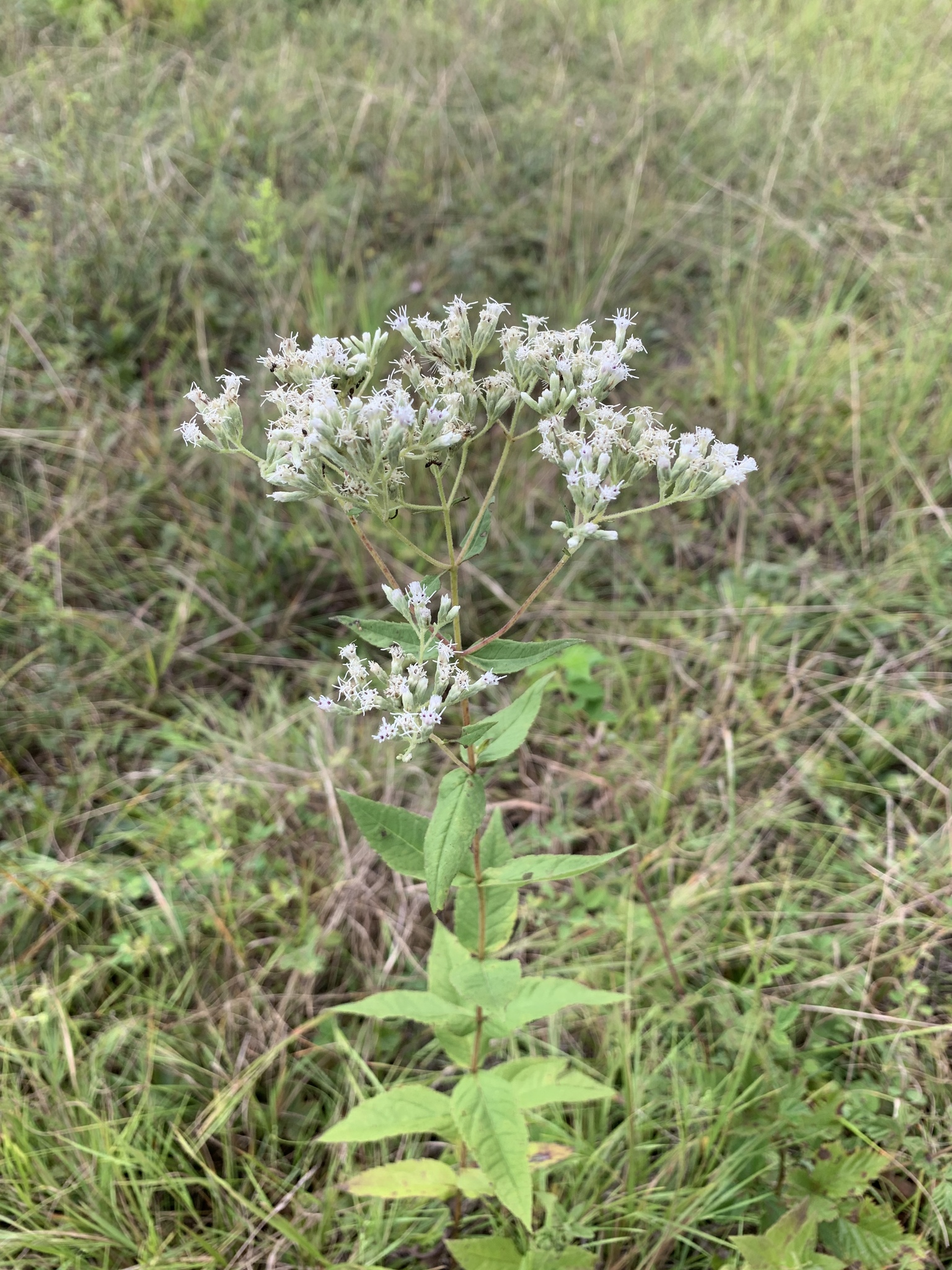

Scientific classification
- Kingdom: Plantae
- Clade: Tracheophytes
- Clade: Angiosperms
- Clade: Eudicots
- Clade: Asterids
- Order: Asterales
- Family: Asteraceae
- Genus: Eupatorium
- Species: E. godfreyanum

Binomial name
- Eupatorium godfreyanum Cronquist

Synonyms
- Eupatorium × godfreyanum Cronquist

= Eupatorium godfreyanum =

Species of flowering plant

Eupatorium godfreyanum, commonly called Godfrey’s thoroughwort, is a North American species of plants in the family Asteraceae. It is found in the east-central United States, primarily from Pennsylvania to North Carolina, with a few isolated populations west of the Appalachians in Ohio, Kentucky, and Tennessee.

Chromosomal analysis suggests that E. godfreyanum originated as a hybrid between E. rotundifolium and E. sessilifolium. Eupatorium godfreyanum does, however, reproduce on its own and can be found in areas where neither parent species is present. Thus it deserves full recognition as a distinct species.

Eupatorium godfreyanum is a tall perennial sometimes over 3 feet (90 cm) tall. It has opposite, lance-shaped or egg-shaped leaves, and flat-topped arrays of a large number of tiny flower heads. Each head has 4-5 white disc florets but no ray florets.
