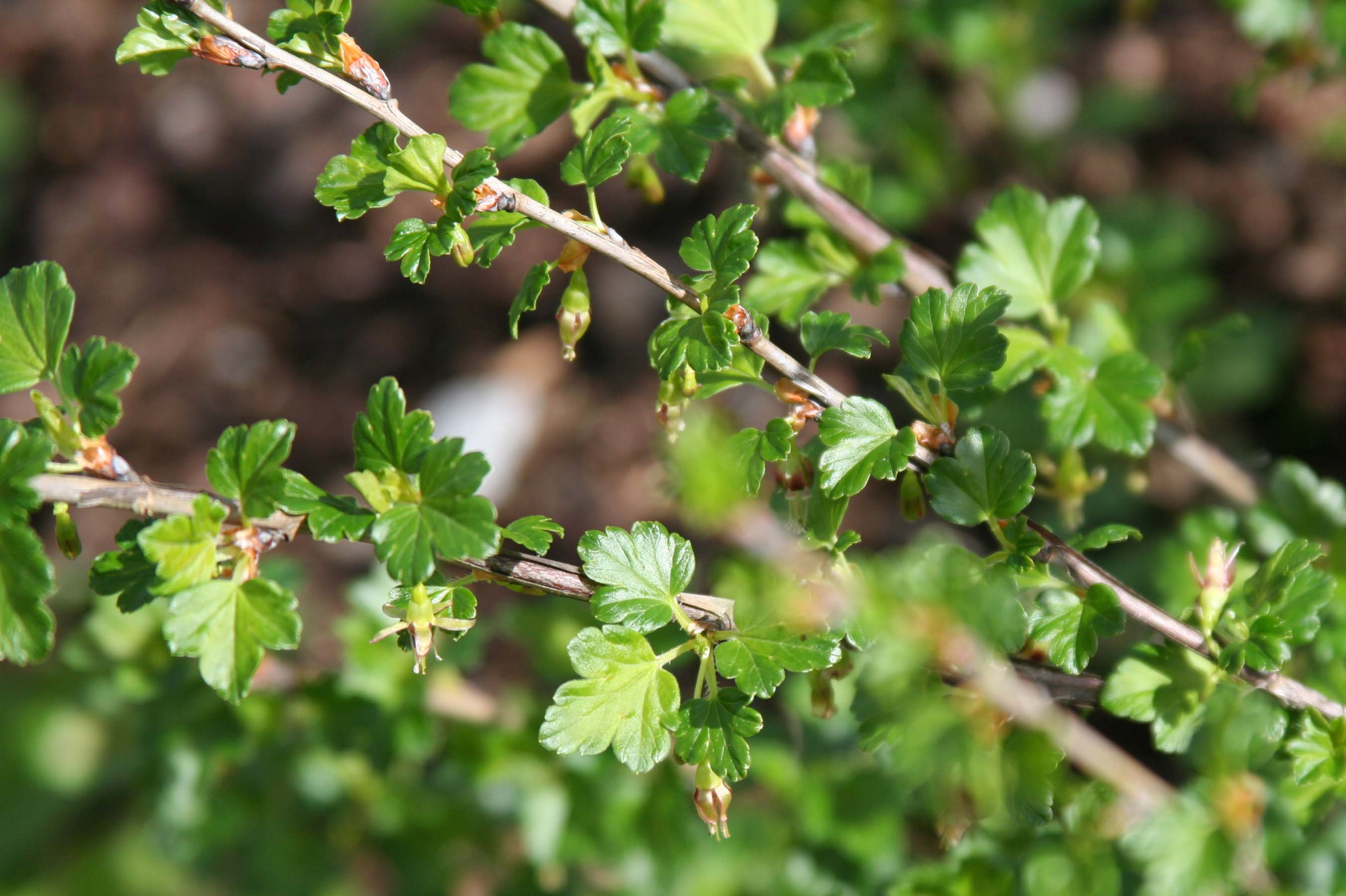

Scientific classification
- Kingdom: Plantae
- Clade: Tracheophytes
- Clade: Angiosperms
- Clade: Eudicots
- Order: Saxifragales
- Family: Grossulariaceae
- Genus: Ribes
- Species: R. rotundifolium

Binomial name
- Ribes rotundifolium Michx. 1803

Synonyms
- Grossularia rotundifolia (Michx.) Coville & Britton

= Ribes rotundifolium =

Species of flowering plant

Ribes rotundifolium is a North American species of currant known by the common names wild gooseberry and Appalachian gooseberry. It is native to the eastern United States, primarily the Adirondacks, from Massachusetts and the Appalachian Mountains south as far as South Carolina and Tennessee.

Ribes rotundifolium is a shrub up to 150 cm (5 ft) tall, with cream-colored, pinkish or pale green pink flowers and dark blue or dark purple berries. Berries are sweet, pale purple berries.
