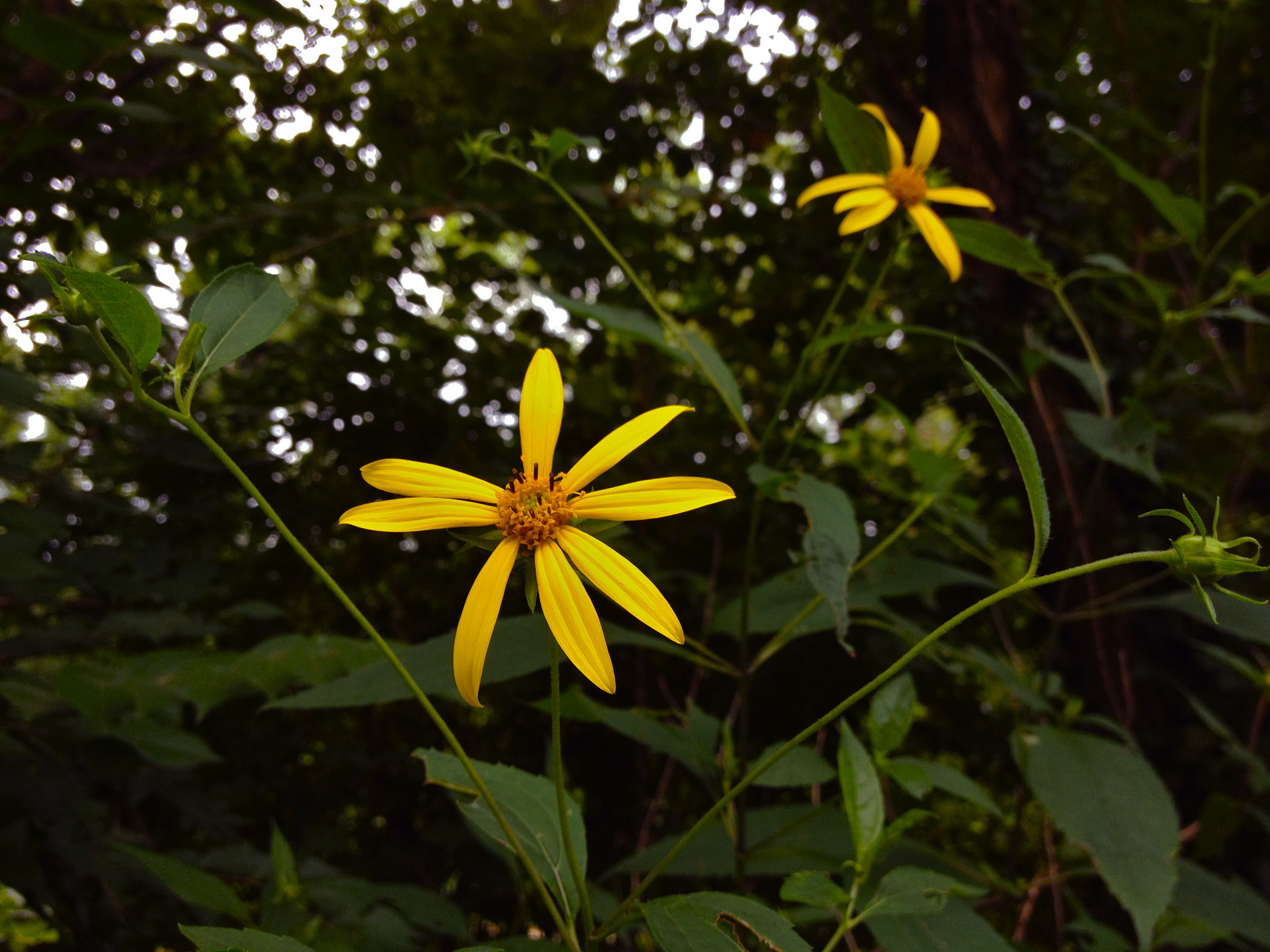
- Chesapeake & Ohio Canal National Historic Park, Washington, D.C.

Conservation status
- Least Concern (IUCN 3.1)

Scientific classification
- Kingdom: Plantae
- Clade: Tracheophytes
- Clade: Angiosperms
- Clade: Eudicots
- Clade: Asterids
- Order: Asterales
- Family: Asteraceae
- Tribe: Heliantheae
- Genus: Helianthus
- Species: H. decapetalus

Binomial name
- Helianthus decapetalus L. 1753 not Darl. 1837

= Helianthus decapetalus =

Species of sunflower

Helianthus decapetalus, known by the common names thinleaf sunflower, thin-leaved sunflower, and woodland sunflower, is a perennial forb in the family Asteraceae. It is native to the Eastern and Central United States and Canada, from New Brunswick west to Iowa, Wisconsin, and Ontario, south as far as Georgia and Louisiana. It produces yellow composite flowers in late summer or early fall.

The name decapetalus means "with ten petals", referring to the 8-12 ray florets on the flower heads, resembling petals.

== Description ==
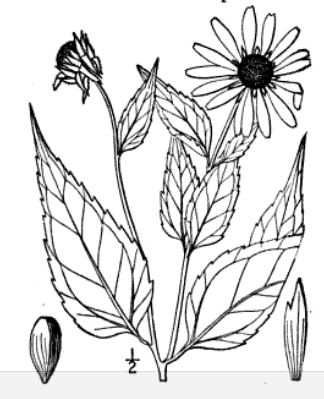
Botanical illustration of Helianthus decapetalus (1913)

The smooth slender stem of H. decapetalus is 60 to 200 cm (2 to 7 ft) tall and branched near the top. The ovate or lanceolate leaves are borne on 2- to 5-cm-long petioles and have serrated edges. They are 7 to 21 cm long and 4 to 10 cm wide. It has three to 10 flowerheads; each flowerhead is composed of 21 to 50 disk florets, and eight to 12 ray florets, which are 2.0 to 2.5 cm long. The bracts are typically 11 to 16 mm long, surpassing the flower disk by at least half their length. The fruit are 3.5- to 5.0-mm-long cypselae with a pappus of two scales.

== Distribution and habitat ==
In Virginia, it grows in habitats such as floodplain forests and riverbanks. Its native habitats include woodland and forest edges. The presence of this species is dependent on appropriate habitat, and it may be eliminated from an area by development, changes in land use, or competition with invasive species.

== Ecology ==
The flowers attract many kinds of insects, including bees and butterflies, some of which, such as the painted lady and the silvery checkerspot, use the plant as a larval host. The seeds provide a source of food for birds. Muskrats eat the leaves and stems and use the stems in the construction of their lodges.
