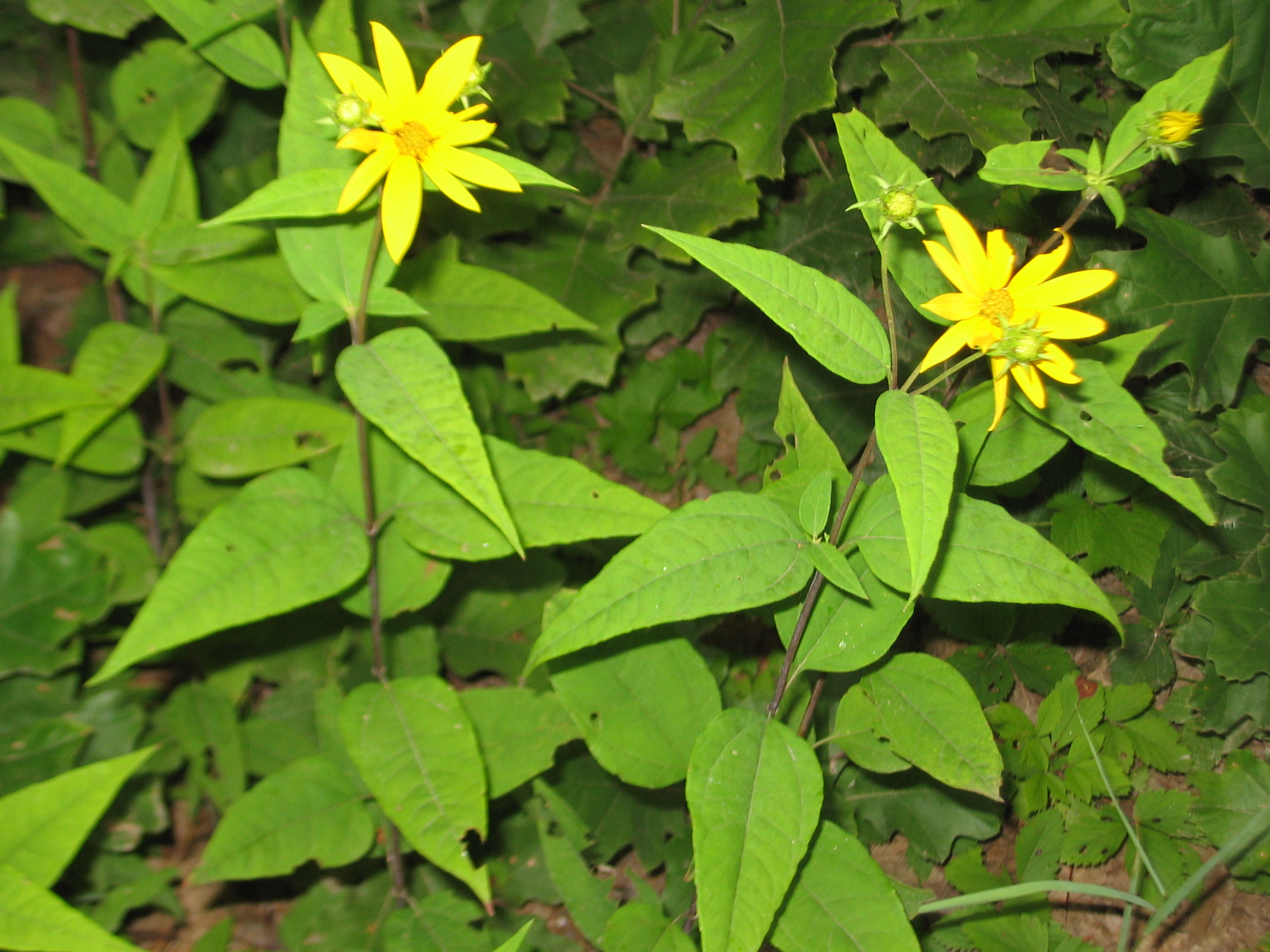

Conservation status
- Secure (NatureServe)

Scientific classification
- Kingdom: Plantae
- Clade: Embryophytes
- Clade: Tracheophytes
- Clade: Spermatophytes
- Clade: Angiosperms
- Clade: Eudicots
- Clade: Asterids
- Order: Asterales
- Family: Asteraceae
- Tribe: Heliantheae
- Genus: Helianthus
- Species: H. divaricatus

Binomial name
- Helianthus divaricatus L.

Synonyms
- Helianthus divaricatus var. angustifolius Kuntze

= Helianthus divaricatus =

Species of sunflower

Helianthus divaricatus, commonly known as the rough sunflower, woodland sunflower, or rough woodland sunflower, is a North American species perennial herb in the family Asteraceae. It is native to central and eastern North America, from Ontario and Quebec in the north, south to Florida and Louisiana and west to Oklahoma and Iowa.

Helanthus divaricatus commonly occurs in dry, relatively open sites. The showy yellow flowers emerge in summer through early fall.

The woodland sunflower is similar to Helianthus hirsutus, but its stem is rough. It grows up to 1.5 m (4 ft 11 in) tall with short stalked, lanceolate to oval leaves, 1–8 cm (0.39–3.15 in) wide with toothed margins. Its flowers have 8 to 15 rays, each 1.5 to 3 cm (0.59 to 1.18 in) long, surrounding an orange or yellowish brown central disk. The plant attracts birds and butterflies. The Latin specific epithet divaricatus means spreading in a straggling manner.
