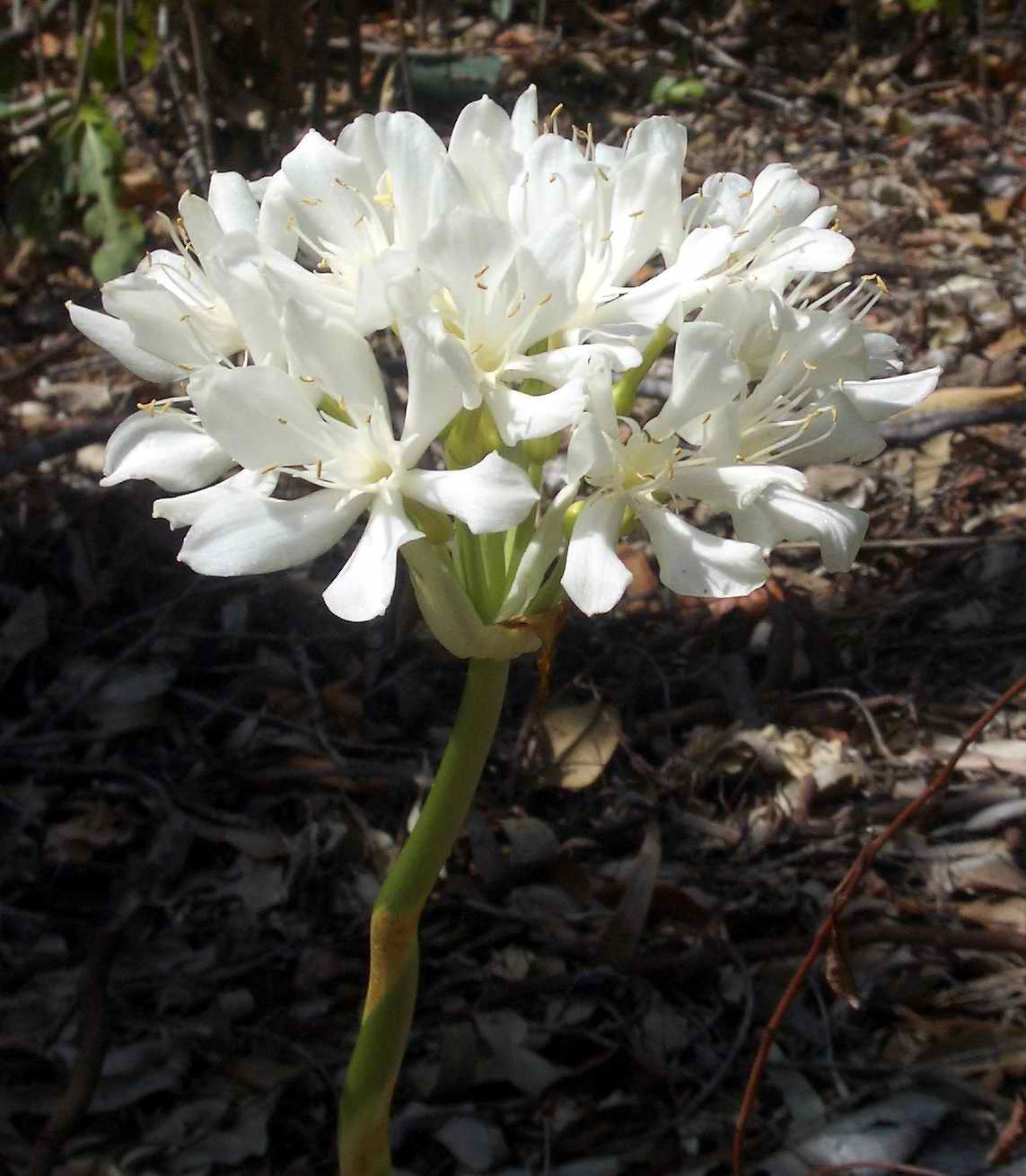
- Proiphys amboinensis

Scientific classification
- Kingdom: Plantae
- Clade: Tracheophytes
- Clade: Angiosperms
- Clade: Monocots
- Order: Asparagales
- Family: Amaryllidaceae
- Subfamily: Amaryllidoideae
- Genus: Proiphys; Herb.

Synonyms
- Cearia Dumort.; Eurycles Drapiez; Stemonix Raf.

= Proiphys =

Genus of plants

Proiphys is a genus of herbaceous, perennial and bulbous plants in the family Amaryllidaceae, subfamily Amaryllidoideae. It includes 5 accepted species that are native to Southeast Asia, Papuasia, and Australia.

Species

- Proiphys alba (R.Br.)Mabb. - New Guinea, Qld, NT, WA
- Proiphys amboinensis (L.) Herb. - Thailand, Philippines, Sulawesi, Lesser Sunda Islands, Papuasia, Qld, WA; known as "Cardwell Lily"
- Proiphys cunninghamii (Aiton ex Lindl.) Mabb. - Qld, NSW; known as "Brisbane Lily" or "Moreton Bay Lily"
- Proiphys infundibularis D.L.Jones & Dowe - Qld
- Proiphys kimberleyensis M.D.Barrett & R.L.Barrett - Northwestern Australia

== Uses ==
Their flowers and leaves make them desirable garden subjects, but they are not widely cultivated as ornamental plants.
