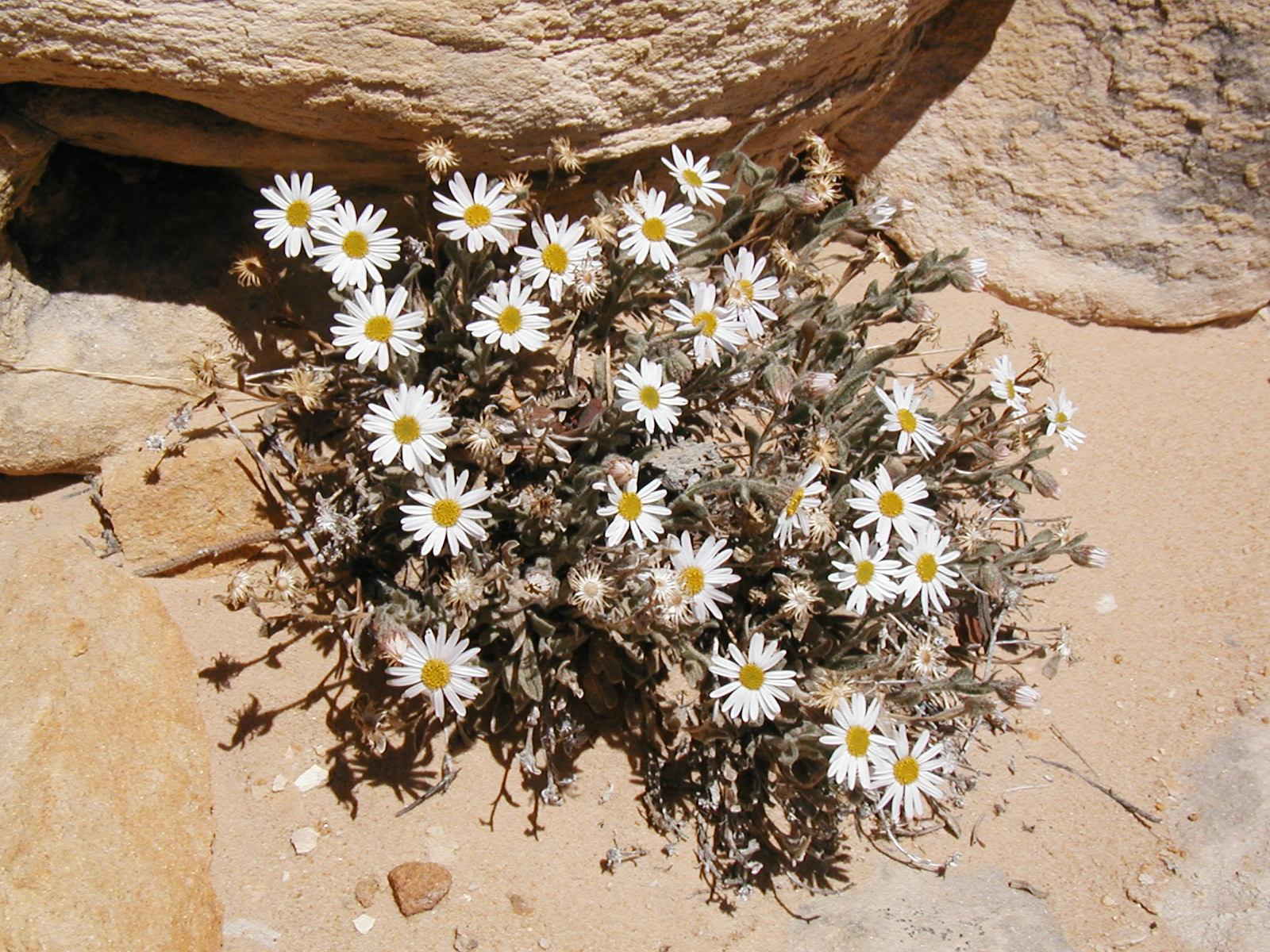

Conservation status
- Imperiled (NatureServe)

Scientific classification
- Kingdom: Plantae
- Clade: Tracheophytes
- Clade: Angiosperms
- Clade: Eudicots
- Clade: Asterids
- Order: Asterales
- Family: Asteraceae
- Genus: Erigeron
- Species: E. maguirei

Binomial name
- Erigeron maguirei Cronquist

Synonyms
- Erigeron maguirei var. harrisonii S.L.Welsh

= Erigeron maguirei =

Species of flowering plant

Erigeron maguirei is a species of flowering plant in the family Asteraceae known by the common names Maguire daisy and Maguire's fleabane. It is endemic to Utah in the United States. It is a perennial herb growing up to 28 centimetres (11 inches) tall. It grows from a taproot and a branching caudex. The stems are densely hairy. The inflorescence holds one to five flower heads each with several hairy, glandular phyllaries. The head has up to 20 white, pink-tinged, or pink ray florets 0.6 to 0.8 centimeters long, and many yellow disc florets at the center.

This plant can be found in the San Rafael Swell and Capitol Reef National Park in Utah. It grows in cracks and crevices in the Navajo Sandstone in canyons, mesas, and washes. It springs up in cool, shady areas where enough organic material accumulates in cracks that it can take hold. The habitat is shrubland and pine and juniper woodland.

This species was previously divided into two varieties. The rare var. maguirei was federally listed as an endangered species in 1985 because there were only five to seven individual plants known, all growing in an area with active uranium mining claims. By 1996, studies indicated that the differences between the two varieties were not controlled by the genes of the plants, so that the division of the species into varieties was not warranted. The two varieties were combined, so both would be considered together under the Endangered Species Act as one species. This automatically made the endangered taxon more abundant than before, and it was downlisted to threatened status. Recent counts suggest there are ten populations containing over 160,000 individuals. The United States Fish and Wildlife Service's target for recovery was set at around 10,000 individuals, so the Service considers the plant to have recovered. In 2011 it was removed from the Endangered Species List.

About 85% of the plant's range is on federal land, giving it some protection. Uranium mining takes place nearby, but not in areas where the plant naturally occurs.
