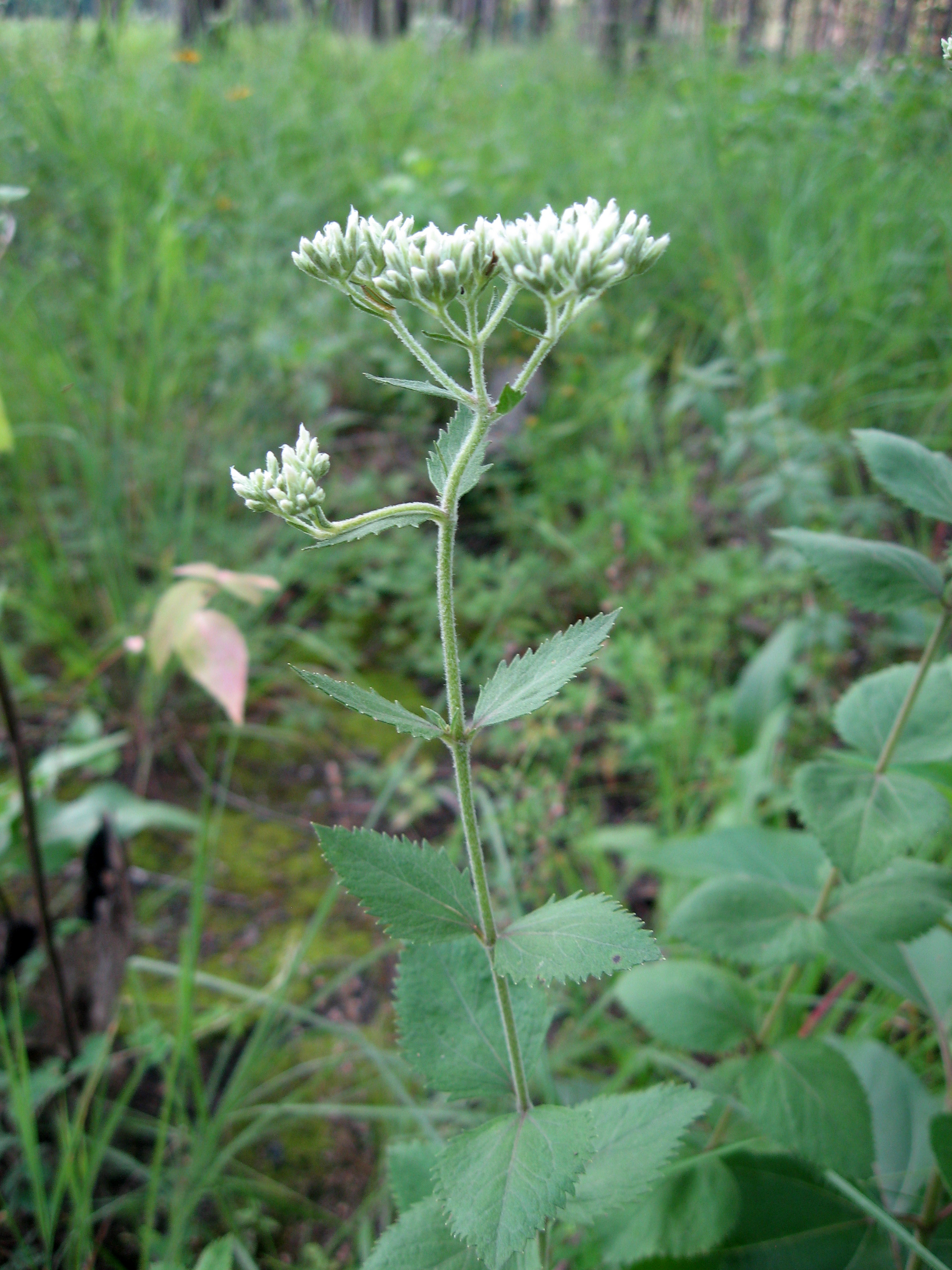

Conservation status
- Secure (NatureServe)

Scientific classification
- Kingdom: Plantae
- Clade: Tracheophytes
- Clade: Angiosperms
- Clade: Eudicots
- Clade: Asterids
- Order: Asterales
- Family: Asteraceae
- Genus: Eupatorium
- Species: E. rotundifolium

Binomial name
- Eupatorium rotundifolium L.

Synonyms
- Synonymy: Critonia elliptica Raf. ex DC.; Eupatorium marrubium Walter; Eupatorium obovatum Raf.; Eupatorium ovatum J.Bigelow; Eupatorium rotundifolium Fernald 1943 not L. 1753; Eupatorium teucrifolium Willd.; Eupatorium verbenaefolium Michaux; Eupatorium verbenifolium Reichard; Uncasia pubescens (Mühlenb. ex Willd.) Greene; Uncasia rotundifolia (L.) Greene; Uncasia scabrida (Elliott) Greene; Uncasia verbenaefolia (Michaux) Greene; Uncasia verbenifolia (Michaux) Greene; Eupatorium pubescens Muhl. ex Willd., syn of var. ovatum; Eupatorium scabridum Elliott, syn of var. scabridum

= Eupatorium rotundifolium =

Roundleaf thoroughwort

Species of flowering plant

Eupatorium rotundifolium, commonly called roundleaf thoroughwort, is a North American species of plant in the family Asteraceae. It native to the eastern and central United States, in all the coastal states from Maine to Texas, and inland as far as Missouri and the Ohio Valley. It is found in low, moist habitats such as wet savannas and bogs.

== Description ==
The stems up to 100 cm (40 inches) tall and are produced from short rhizomes. The inflorescences are composed of a large number of small white flower heads, each with 5 disc florets but no ray florets. Plants can be highly variable due to hybridization.

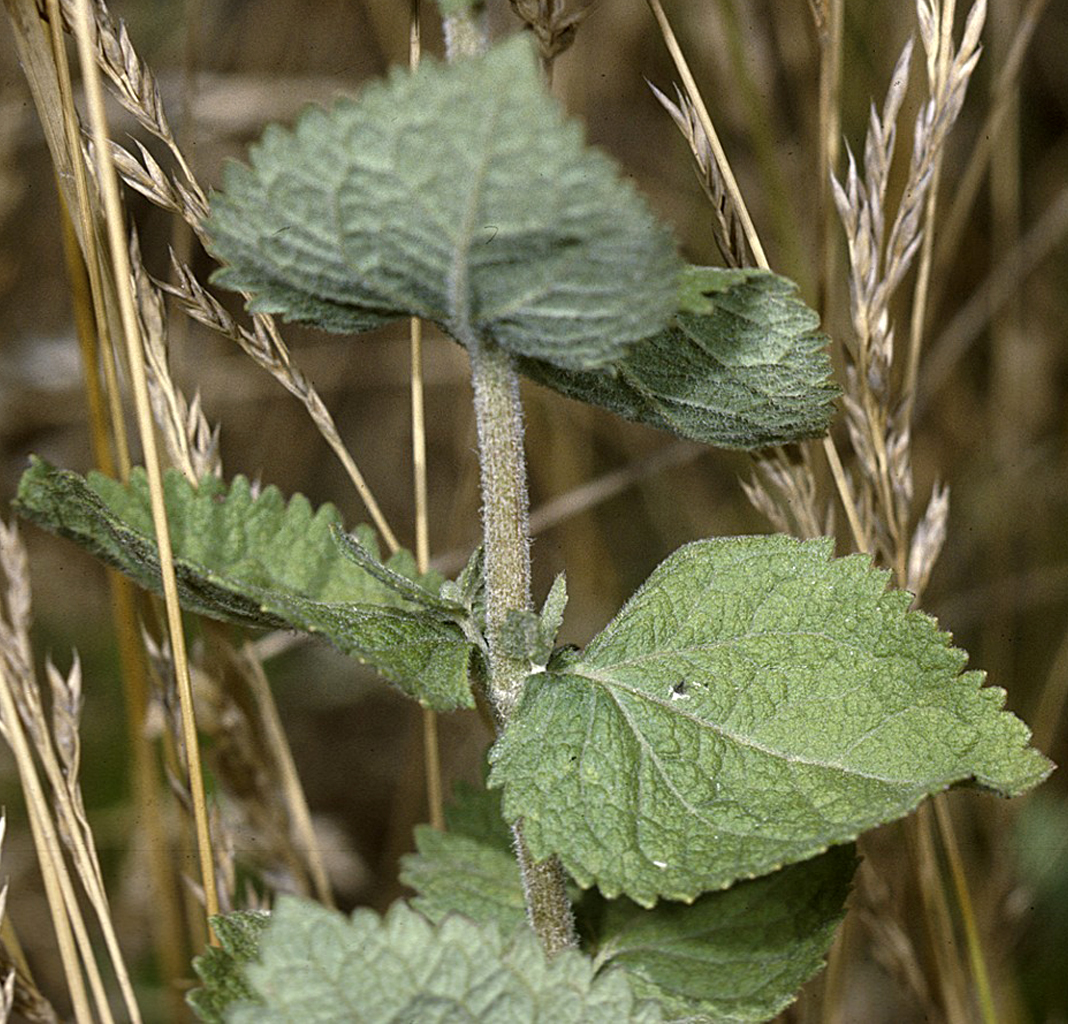
Detail of stem and leaves. (Photo by Robert H. Mohlenbrock)

== Distribution and habitat ==
Eupatorium rotundifolium is found from Massachusetts, New York, Indiana, and Oklahoma south to southern Florida and Texas. It grows in moist to dry woodlands, pine savannas, seepage bogs, as well as along roadsides.

== Taxonomy ==
Three varieties of Eupatorium rotundifolium are recognized. They are:

- Eupatorium rotundifolium var. ovatum (Bigelow) Torr.
- Eupatorium rotundifolium var. rotundifolium
- Eupatorium rotundifolium var. scabridum (Elliott) A.Gray

The plants known as Eupatorium rotundifolium var. saundersii have often been treated as a variety of E. rotundifolium. They can be distinguished based on morphology, and molecular evidence also suggests that these plants may be different enough from E. rotundifolium to recognize them as a species, Eupatorium pilosum.

=== Hybridization ===
As is common in Eupatorium, E. rotundifolium can form hybrids with other species in the genus. In particular, Eupatorium godfreyanum is a hybrid of E. rotundifolium and Eupatorium sessilifolium.

== Uses ==
Eupatorium rotundifolium contains sesquiterpene lactones of the guaianolide type including euparotin acetate and eupachlorin acetate, both of which inhibit tumor growth in vitro when isolated from the plant.

Medicinally, the plant was used to treat intermittent fevers in the past.
