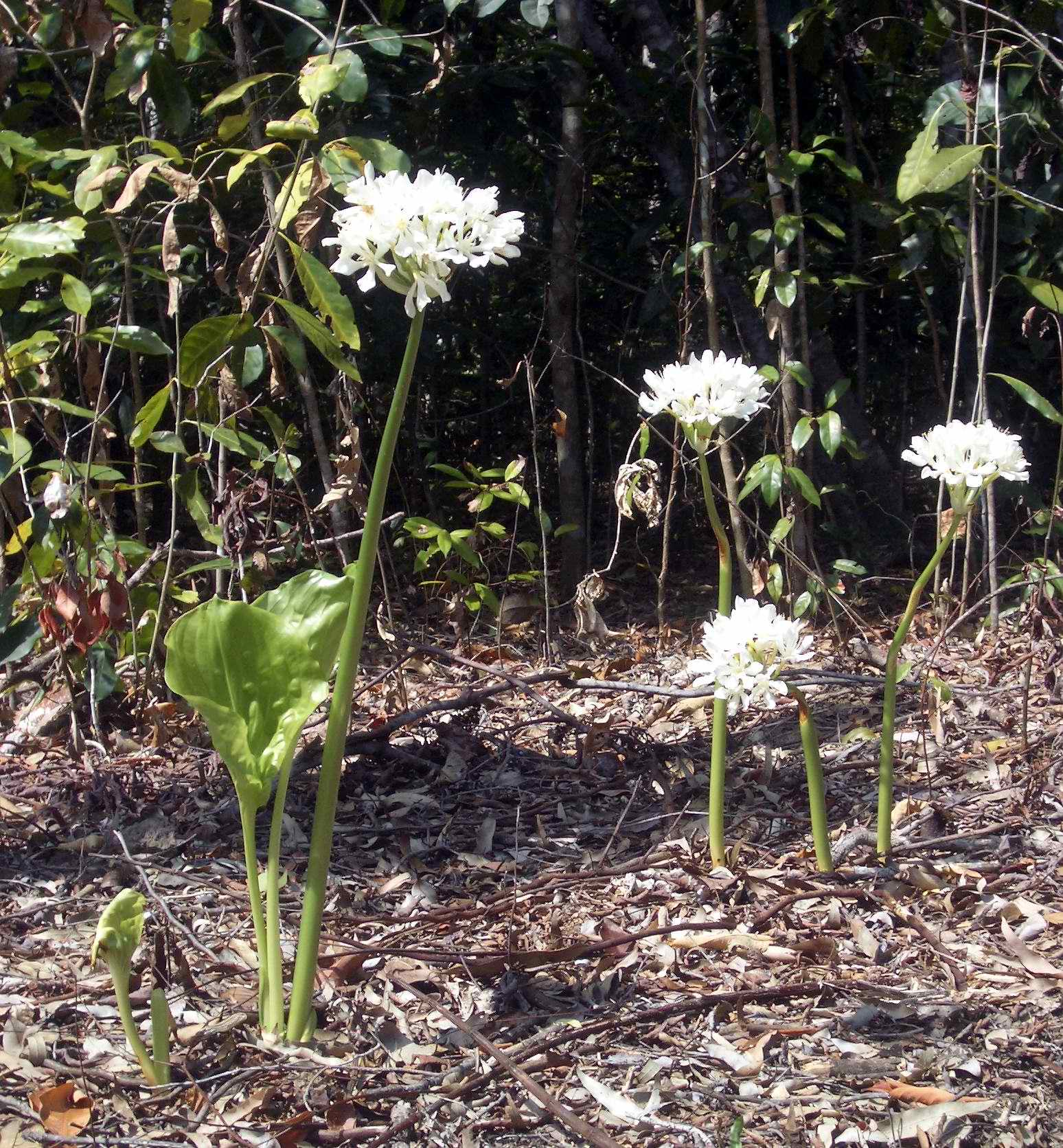
- In Cooktown, Queensland

Scientific classification
- Kingdom: Plantae
- Clade: Tracheophytes
- Clade: Angiosperms
- Clade: Monocots
- Order: Asparagales
- Family: Amaryllidaceae
- Subfamily: Amaryllidoideae
- Genus: Proiphys
- Species: P. amboinensis

Binomial name
- Proiphys amboinensis (L.) Herb.

Synonyms
- List: Amaryllis rotundifolia Lam.; Cearia amboinensis (L.) Dumort.; Cepa amboinensis (L.) Kuntze; Crinum nervosum L'Hér.; Eurycles alata Sweet; Eurycles amboinensis (L.) Lindl. ex Loudon; Eurycles australasica (Ker Gawl.) G.Don; Eurycles coronata Sweet; Eurycles javanica M.Roem.; Eurycles nervosa G.Don; Eurycles nuda Sweet; Eurycles rotundifolia M.Roem.; Pancratium amboinense L.; Pancratium australasicum Ker Gawl.; Pancratium nervifolium Salisb.; Pancratium ovatifolium Stokes; Stemonix nervosus (L'Hér.) Raf.

= Proiphys amboinensis =

Cardwell lily

Species of flowering plant

Proiphys amboinensis is the type species of the flowering plant genus Proiphys. Its common names include Cardwell lily and northern Christmas lily (as it usually flowers around Christmas). It is considered native to Thailand, Indonesia (Maluku, Sulawesi, Bali, Lombok, Timor), the Philippines, the Bismark Archipelago, Vanuatu, New Guinea and Australia (Queensland and Western Australia). It is also naturalized in Seychelles, Sri Lanka, Solomon Islands, Niue, Society Islands, Caroline Islands and Mariana Islands.

== Taxonomy ==
Its species epithet amboinensis was named after the island of Ambonia, now Ambon in Indonesia.

== Description ==
The Caldwell lily grows on seashores and rocky places up to an altitude of 500 metres. It prefers open, lightly shaded rainforests. It grows from a bulb measuring up to 8 centimetres in diameter; it grows quickly after the arrival of the wet season in Australia. Its leaves are ovate and nearly circular measuring 20–30 cm long and 15–35 cm wide from stalks between 15 and 60 centimetres long. The leaves die away in the dry season.

=== Umbel ===
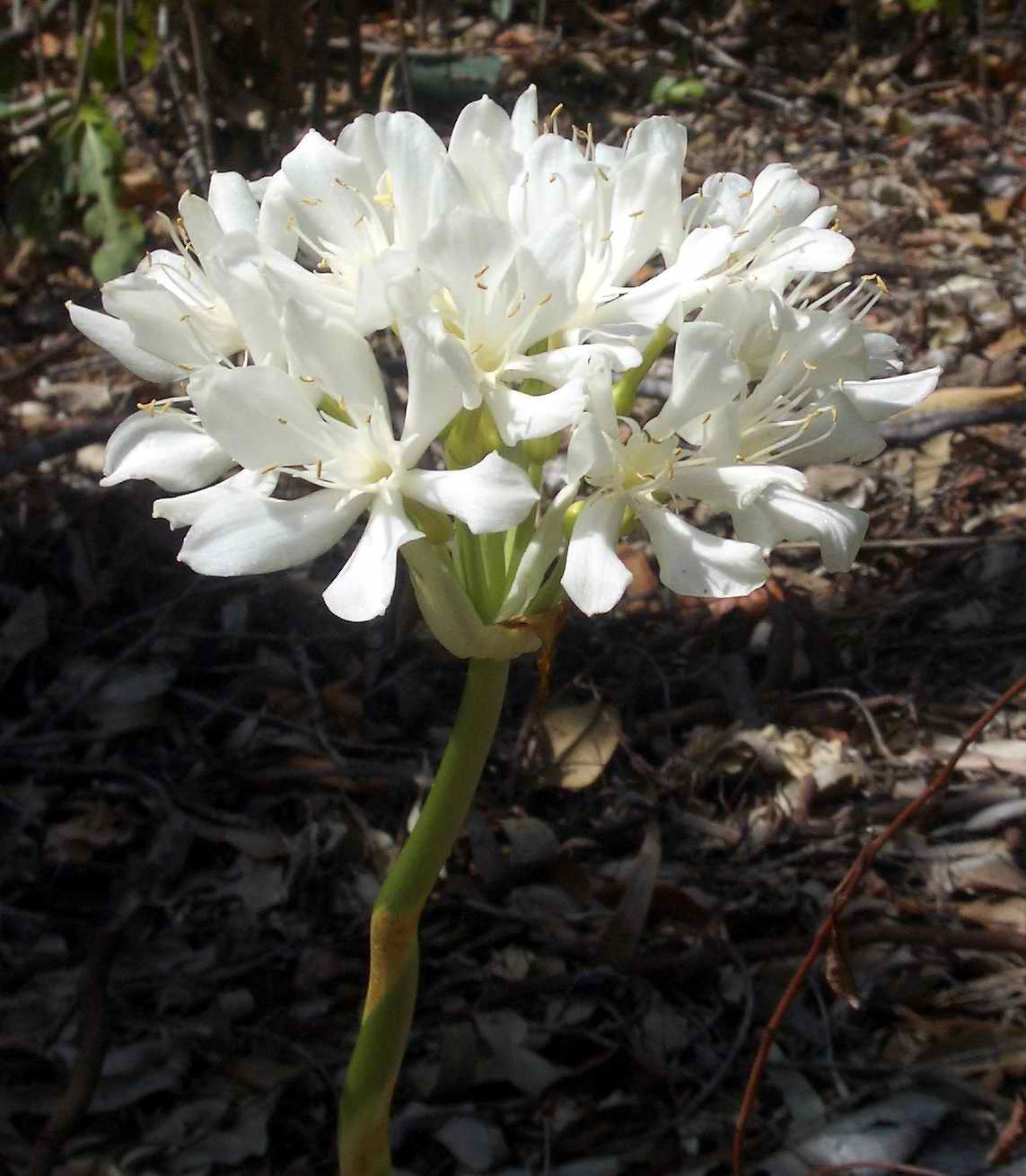
Cardwell lily flower umbel

A total of 5–25 white flowers grow in an umbel on stalks over between 15 and 90 cm long, each flower is trumpet shaped and release a pleasant scent with filaments 2–3 mm long. Flowering in Australia typically begins in late December while flowering season in India is from May to June.

Fruit produced from pollination are green to blackish capsules 25–30 mm across.

== Cultivation and uses ==
It is a good container plant that needs much water in the growing season. Propagate from seed or lift the bulb.
