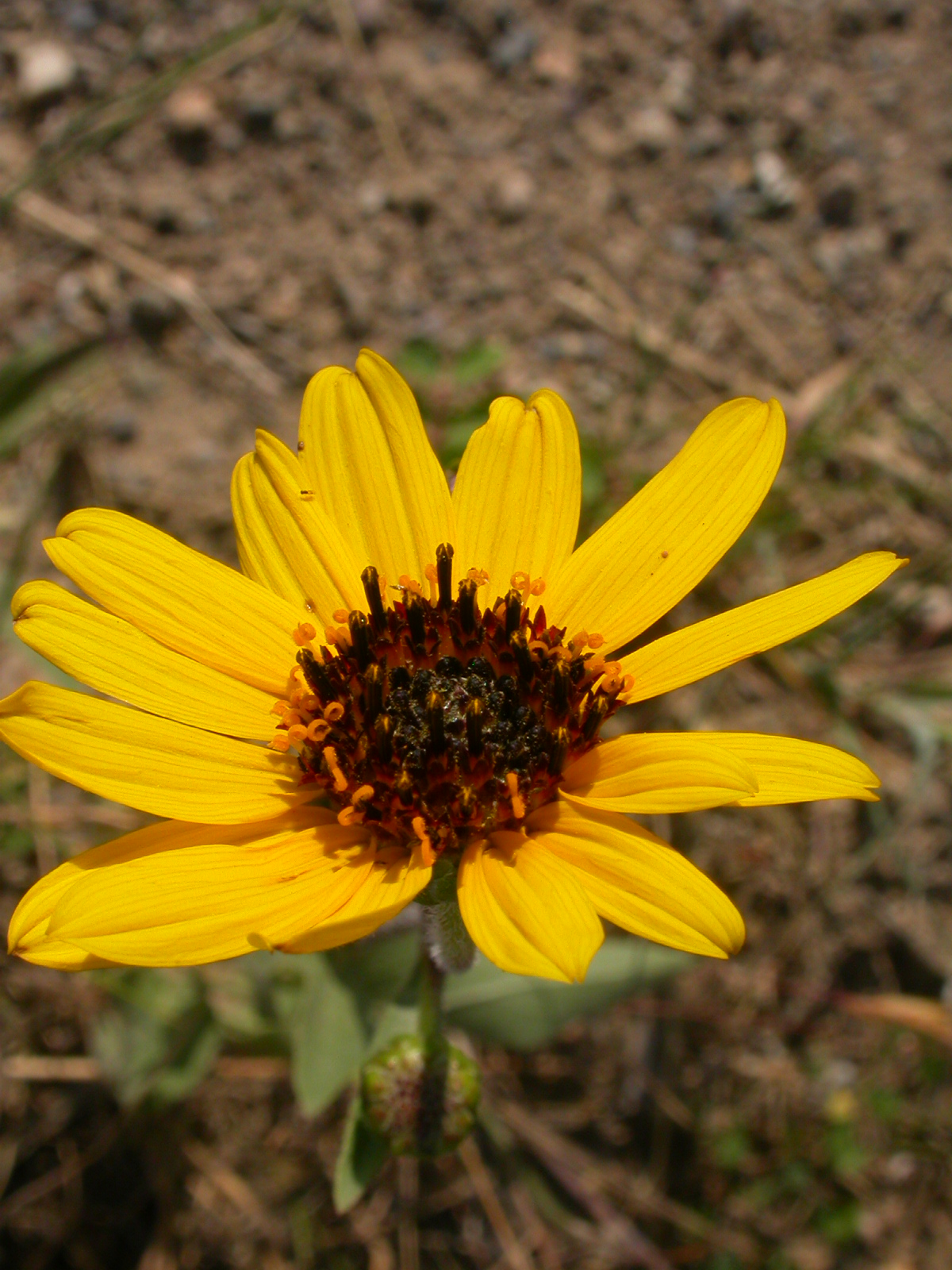

Conservation status
- Least Concern (IUCN 3.1)

- Secure (NatureServe)

Scientific classification
- Kingdom: Plantae
- Clade: Tracheophytes
- Clade: Angiosperms
- Clade: Eudicots
- Clade: Asterids
- Order: Asterales
- Family: Asteraceae
- Genus: Helianthus
- Species: H. pauciflorus

Binomial name
- Helianthus pauciflorus Nutt.

Synonyms
- Harpalium rigidum Cass.; Helianthus rigidus (Cass.) Desf.; Helianthus subrhomboideus Rydb., syn of subsp. subrhomboideus

= Helianthus pauciflorus =

Species of sunflower

Helianthus pauciflorus, called the stiff sunflower, is a North American plant species in the family Asteraceae. It is widespread across the Great Plains, the Rocky Mountains, and the Great Lakes region, and naturalized in scattered locations in the eastern United States and in much of southern Canada (from Alberta to Nova Scotia).

Stiff sunflower is a perennial herb 50–200 cm (1 ft 8 in – 6 ft 7 in) tall, spreading by means of underground rhizomes. Most of the leaves are attached near the bottom of the stem. One plant can produces 1-10 flower heads, each head with 10-20 yellow ray florets surrounding at least 75 red or (less often) yellow disc florets.

Hybrids between H. pauciflorus and H. tuberosus (Jerusalem artichoke) are known as H. × laetiflorus. The name H. laetiflorus has also been used as a synonym of H. pauciflorus.

Subspecies

- Helianthus pauciflorus subsp. pauciflorus: 80–200 cm (2 ft 7 in – 6 ft 7 in) tall; leaves alternate near the end of the stem, 8–27 cm (3 1/4–10 3/4 in) long, with tips acuminate (tapered to a point).
- Helianthus pauciflorus subsp. subrhomboideus (Rydb.) O.Spring & E.E.Schill.: 50–120 cm (1 ft 8 in – 3 ft 11 in) tall; leaves opposite, 5–12 cm (2–5 in) long, with acute or obtuse tips.
