= Elba Emanuel Watson =

American botanist (1871–1936)

Elba Emanuel Watson (1871 – September 27, 1936) was an American botanist, noted for his study of the genus Helianthus.

== Life and education ==
Raised in Grand Rapids, Watson attended University of Michigan for his bachelor's degree. After graduation, Watson taught German in a high school located in Greater New York for many years. He later returned to University of Michigan and earned his M.S. in botany in 1918. He then remained in the university one more year to work as a teaching assistant. After moving back to the Greater New York area, he worked at New York Botanical Garden for a year and then taught at Rutgers College for a year. In 1922, he entered the Graduate School of Michigan State College, and in 1926, completed his Ph.D. thesis on the genus Helianthus. Watson worked as a German instructor after receiving his Ph.D. After his sudden death at age 65, he was buried in Okemos, MI.

== Written works ==
- Watson, Elba Emanuel (1929). Contributions to a Monograph of the Genus Helianthus. Michigan State College of Agriculture and Applied Science. (Watson's Ph.D. Dissertation)

The standard author abbreviation E.Watson is used to indicate this person as the author when citing a botanical name.
