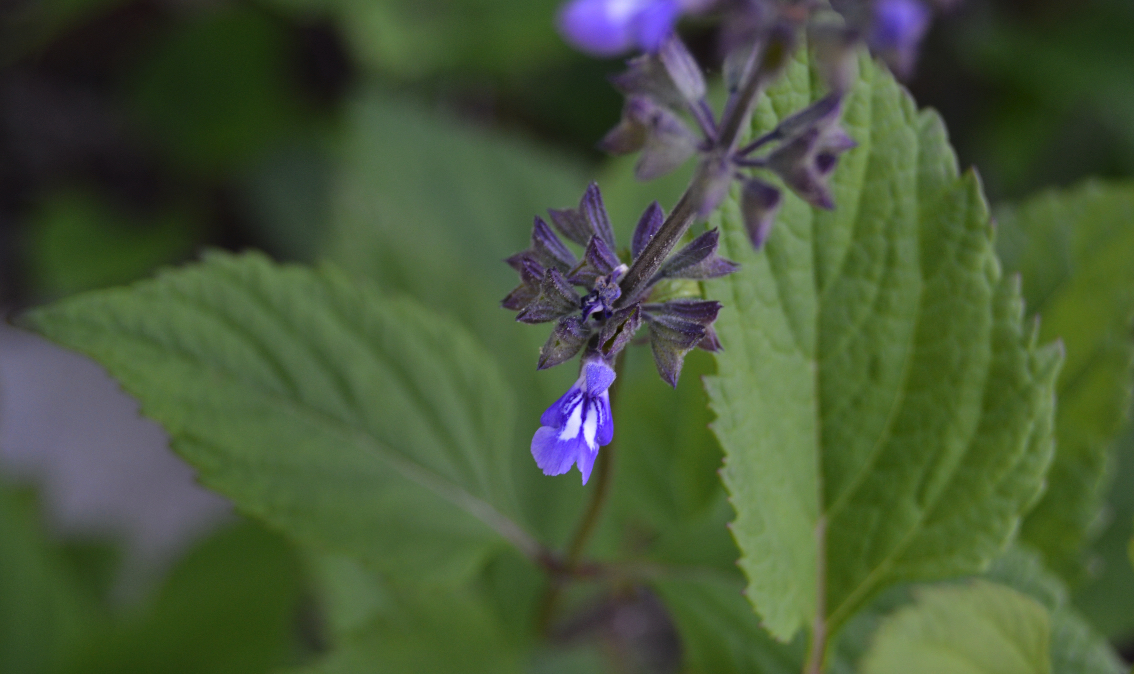

Scientific classification
- Kingdom: Plantae
- Clade: Tracheophytes
- Clade: Angiosperms
- Clade: Eudicots
- Clade: Asterids
- Order: Lamiales
- Family: Lamiaceae
- Genus: Salvia
- Species: S. urticifolia

Binomial name
- Salvia urticifolia L.

= Salvia urticifolia =

Species of flowering plant

Salvia urticifolia (nettleleaf sage, nettle-leaved sage, wild sage) is a herbaceous perennial native to the southeastern United States. S. urticifolia is an erect plant that reaches 20 to 70 cm (7.9 to 27.6 in) tall. Flowers, with a corolla that is approximately 1.2 cm (0.47 in) long, are blue or purple (occasionally white), growing in panicles on short pedicels. The lower lip has three lobes, with a pair of white marks coming from the throat. The leaves are crenate—similar to the leaves of Urtica species.
