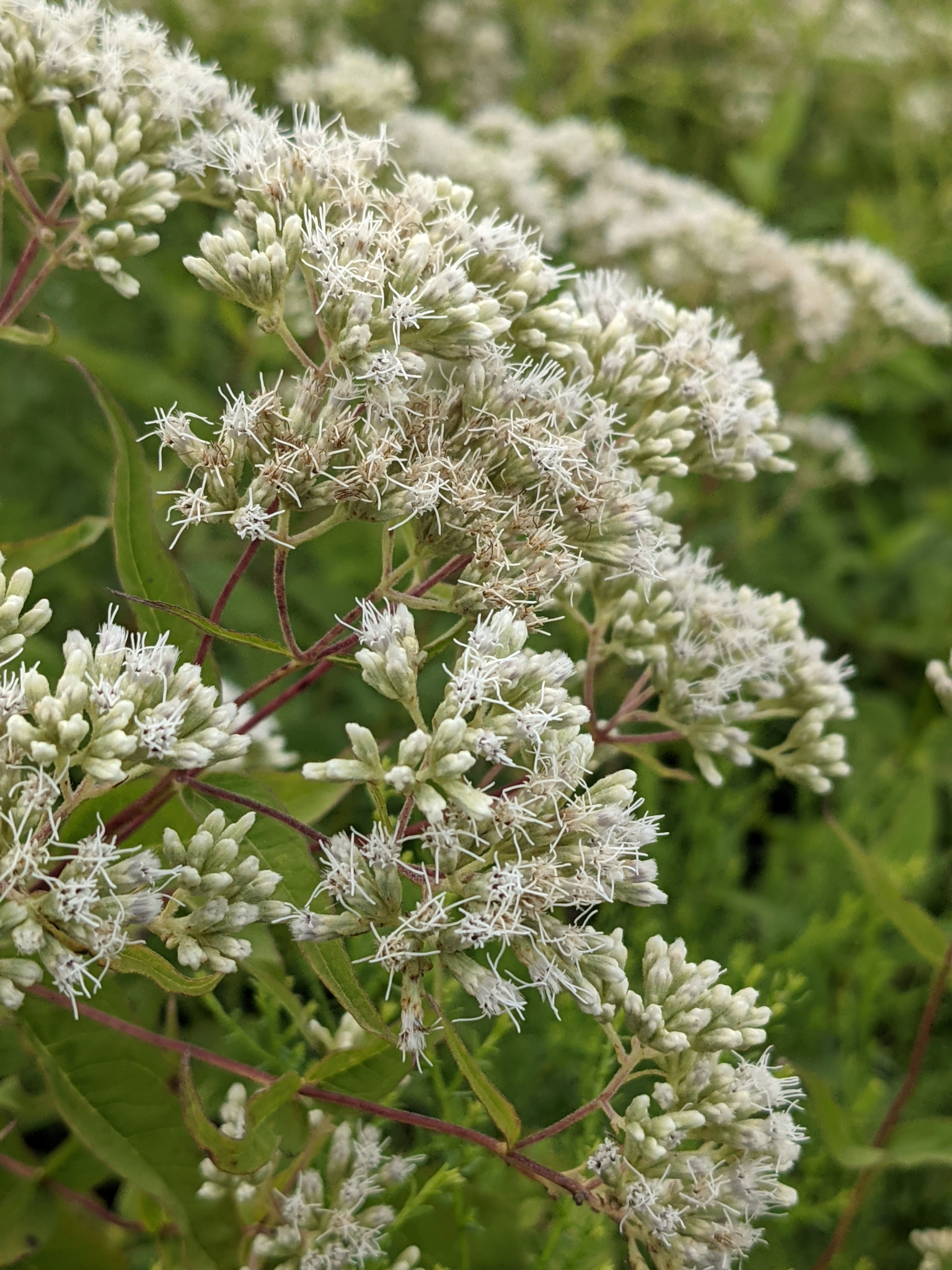

Conservation status
- Secure (NatureServe)

Scientific classification
- Kingdom: Plantae
- Clade: Tracheophytes
- Clade: Angiosperms
- Clade: Eudicots
- Clade: Asterids
- Order: Asterales
- Family: Asteraceae
- Genus: Eupatorium
- Species: E. sessilifolium

Binomial name
- Eupatorium sessilifolium L.

Synonyms
- Eupatorium sessilifolium f. inciso-serratum Jenn.; Eupatorium sessilifolium f. sessilifolium; Eupatorium sessilifolium var. brittonianum Porter; Eupatorium sessilifolium var. sessilifolium L.; Eupatorium truncatum Mühlenb. ex Elliott; Eupatorium vaseyi Porter; Eupatorium truncatum Mühlenb. ex Elliott; Eupatorium vaseyi Porter; Uncasia sessilifolia (L.) Greene

= Eupatorium sessilifolium =

Upland boneset

Species of flowering plant

Eupatorium sessilifolium, commonly called upland boneset or sessile-leaved boneset, is a North American plant species in the family Asteraceae. It is native to the eastern and central United States, found from Maine south to North Carolina and Alabama, and west as far as Arkansas, Kansas, and Minnesota.

== Description ==
Eupatorium sessilifolium is a perennial herb with stems that are sometimes more than 100 centimeters (40 inches) tall. They are produced from a woody underground caudice or short rhizome. The top of the stems, where the branching begins to the flower heads, have short hairs, while the lower part of the stems have no hairs. The leaves are arranged in opposite pairs and are toothed. The leaf bases are rounded and the leaves are sessile (lacking stalks), but they do not clasp around the stem. The foliage is dotted with glands. Eupatorium sessilifolium blooms in August and September (July in the southern part of its range), and the small inflorescences are branched and composed of widely spaced, tiny white flower heads in corymbiform (flat topped) arrays. The heads typically have five or six disc florets per head, but no ray florets.

== Habitat and distribution ==
Eupatorium sessilifolium is found growing in open woods or edges of woods with soils that have good drainage and it is found uncommonly in prairie remnants.

Upland boneset is a threatened species in Michigan, and legally protected in that state. It is also a threatened species in Minnesota, where only a few populations exist in the extreme south eastern part of the state.

== Hybrids ==
As is common in Eupatorium, E. sessilifolium can form hybrids with other species in the genus. In particular, Eupatorium godfreyanum is a hybrid of E. sessilifolium and Eupatorium rotundifolium (although it reproduces by apomixis and thus can be found outside the range of the two parent species).
