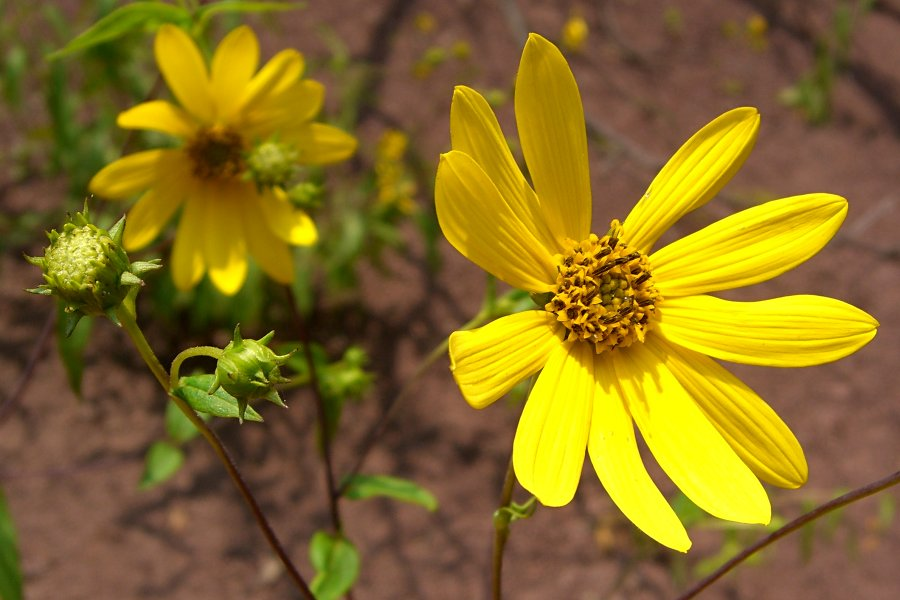

Conservation status
- Least Concern (IUCN 3.1)

Scientific classification
- Kingdom: Plantae
- Clade: Embryophytes
- Clade: Tracheophytes
- Clade: Spermatophytes
- Clade: Angiosperms
- Clade: Eudicots
- Clade: Asterids
- Order: Asterales
- Family: Asteraceae
- Tribe: Heliantheae
- Genus: Helianthus
- Species: H. hirsutus

Binomial name
- Helianthus hirsutus Raf. 1820

Synonyms
- Synonymy: Helianthus eggertii Small; Helianthus montanus E.Watson; Helianthus saxicola Small; Helianthus scrophulariifolius Britton; Helianthus stenophyllus (Torr. & A.Gray) E.Watson; Helianthus strumosus L.; Helianthus trachelifolius Mill.

= Helianthus hirsutus =

Species of sunflower

Helianthus hirsutus is a North American species of sunflower known by the common name hairy sunflower. It is widespread across south-central Canada, the eastern and central United States, and northeastern Mexico. It ranges from Ontario south to Florida, Coahuila, and Nuevo León, and west as far as Minnesota, Nebraska, and Texas.

Helianthus hirsutus is a perennial sometimes as much as 200 cm (almost 7 feet) tall, spreading by means of underground rhizomes. Leaves and stems are covered with stiff hairs. One plant can produce 1–7 flower heads, each with 10–15 yellow ray florets surrounding 40 or more yellow disc florets. The species grows in sunny locations in open forests or along the edges of forests.

== Ecology ==
Helianthus hirsutus is insect pollinated and is recorded to have been visited in northern Florida by Augochlorella aurata, Megachile parallela, and Svastra aegis.

== See also ==
- Jerusalem artichoke
