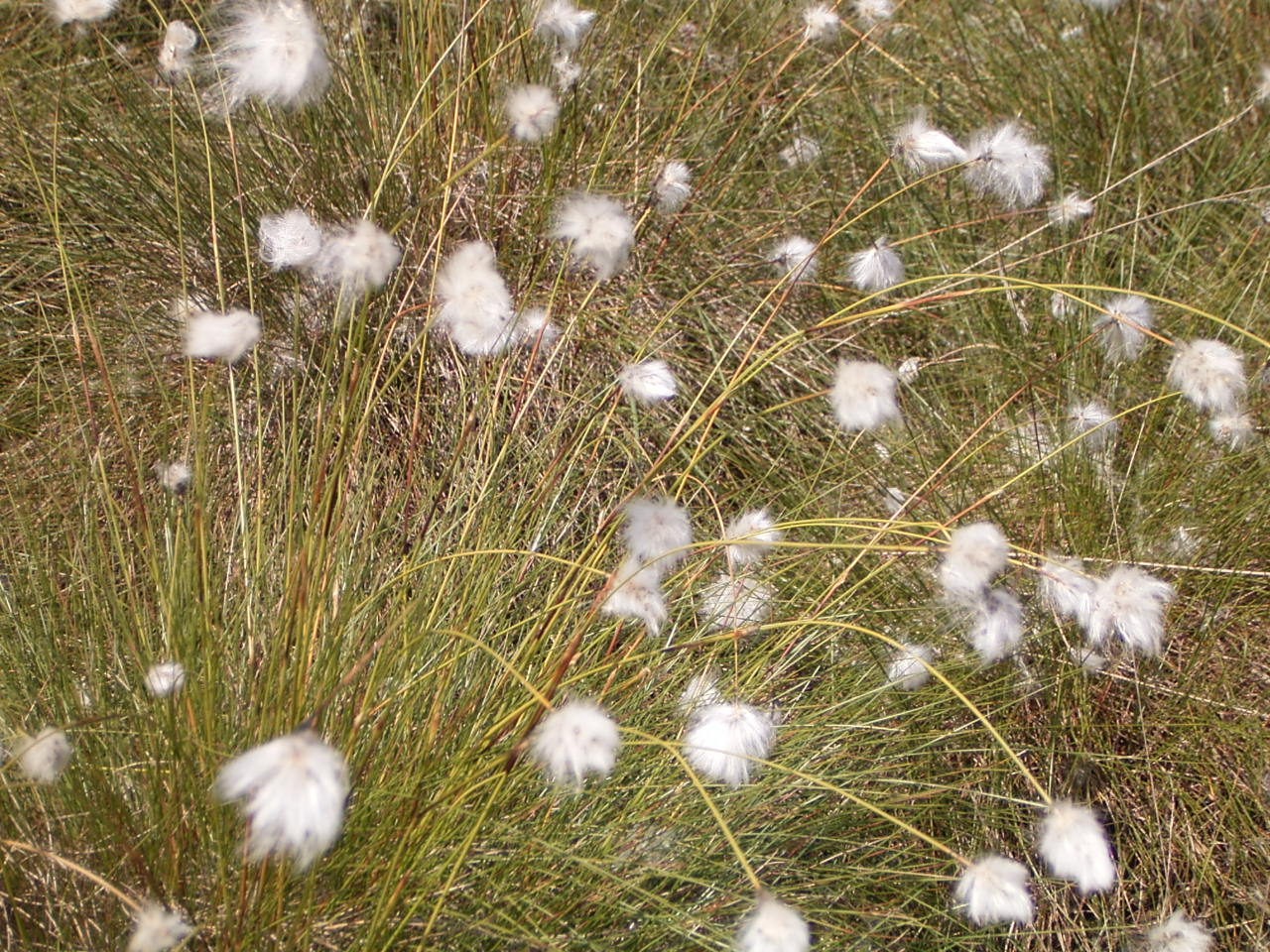

Conservation status
- Least Concern (IUCN 3.1)

- Secure (NatureServe)

Scientific classification
- Kingdom: Plantae
- Clade: Embryophytes
- Clade: Tracheophytes
- Clade: Angiosperms
- Clade: Monocots
- Clade: Commelinids
- Order: Poales
- Family: Cyperaceae
- Genus: Eriophorum
- Species: E. vaginatum

Binomial name
- Eriophorum vaginatum L.

Synonyms
- Homotypic synonyms: Linagrostis vaginata (L.) Scop.; Plumaria vaginata (L.) Bubani; Scirpus vaginatus (L.) Salisb.; Heterotypic synonyms: Eriophorum caespitosum Host; Eriophorum caespitosum var. humilius E.Mey.; Eriophorum callithrix Lange; Eriophorum fauriei E.G.Camus; Eriophorum kerneri Ullep.; Eriophorum scabridum Ohwi; Eriophorum spissum Fernald; Eriophorum vaginatum var. fauriei (E.G.Camus) Kitag.; Eriophorum vaginatum subsp. fauriei (E.G.Camus) Á.Löve & D.Löve; Eriophorum vaginatum var. spissum (Fernald) B.Boivin; Eriophorum vaginatum subsp. spissum (Fernald) Hultén; Scirpus fauriei (E.G.Camus) T.Koyama

= Eriophorum vaginatum =

Species of flowering plant

Eriophorum vaginatum is a species of flowering plant in the sedge family Cyperaceae. It occurs throughout the subarctic and temperate regions of the Northern Hemisphere. It prefers wet, acidic, peaty soil and is often dominant in bogs, poor fens, and the Arctic tundra regions of northern Russia and Canada. The specific epithet vaginatum, which means "having a sheath", refers to an important character used to recognize this species. Both the scientific name Eriophorum vaginatum and the common name sheathed cottonsedge emphasize this fact. In Britain and Ireland (and elsewhere), the species is referred to as hare's-tail cottongrass (or simply hare's-tail). The name tussock cottongrass gained in popularity after its publication in Flora of North America in 2002.

Eriophorum vaginatum is a member of the unispicate group of cottongrasses since it has one (not multiple) spikelets. It is similar in appearance to the unispicate species Eriophorum brachyantherum and Eriophorum callitrix, all three of which have densely tufted stems. Eriophorum vaginatum is distinguished by having spreading scales at the base of the inflorescence, a conspicuously inflated sheath on its flowering stem, and a tussock-forming growth habit.

Some botanists recognize two (or even three) subspecies. One of those subspecies, Eriophorum vaginatum subsp. spissum, is widespread throughout northeastern North America but the full extent of its range is unknown. It differs from the typical subspecies based on the shape of its spikelet, the color of its scales, and length of its anthers. In Canada, the subspecies is known as dense cottongrass, a characteristic that is likewise true of all subspecies.

== Description ==
Eriophorum vaginatum is a perennial, tussock-forming sedge. It has a cespitose (tufted) growth habit, with multiple flowering stems at the base of the plant. A stem may reach up to 60 cm (24 in) tall, with a persistent brown sheath at its base. Basal leaves are approximately 1 mm wide and noticeably shorter than the flowering stem. There are 1–3 leaves along the length of the stem, each reduced to a sheath (no leaf blade). The uppermost sheath is conspicuously inflated. The inflorescence is a single erect spikelet at the tip of the stem. The spikelet bears numerous florets, each covered by a scale (a type of bract in sedges and grasses). At the base of the inflorescence, there are 10 or more empty scales (with no flowers), the lowermost scales becoming spreading or reflexed at maturity. The flower parts emerge from the axils of the floral scales. After pollination, each floret develops 10 or more white bristles that elongate to 2 cm at maturity. The fruit is a small brown nutlet no more than 3.5 mm long.

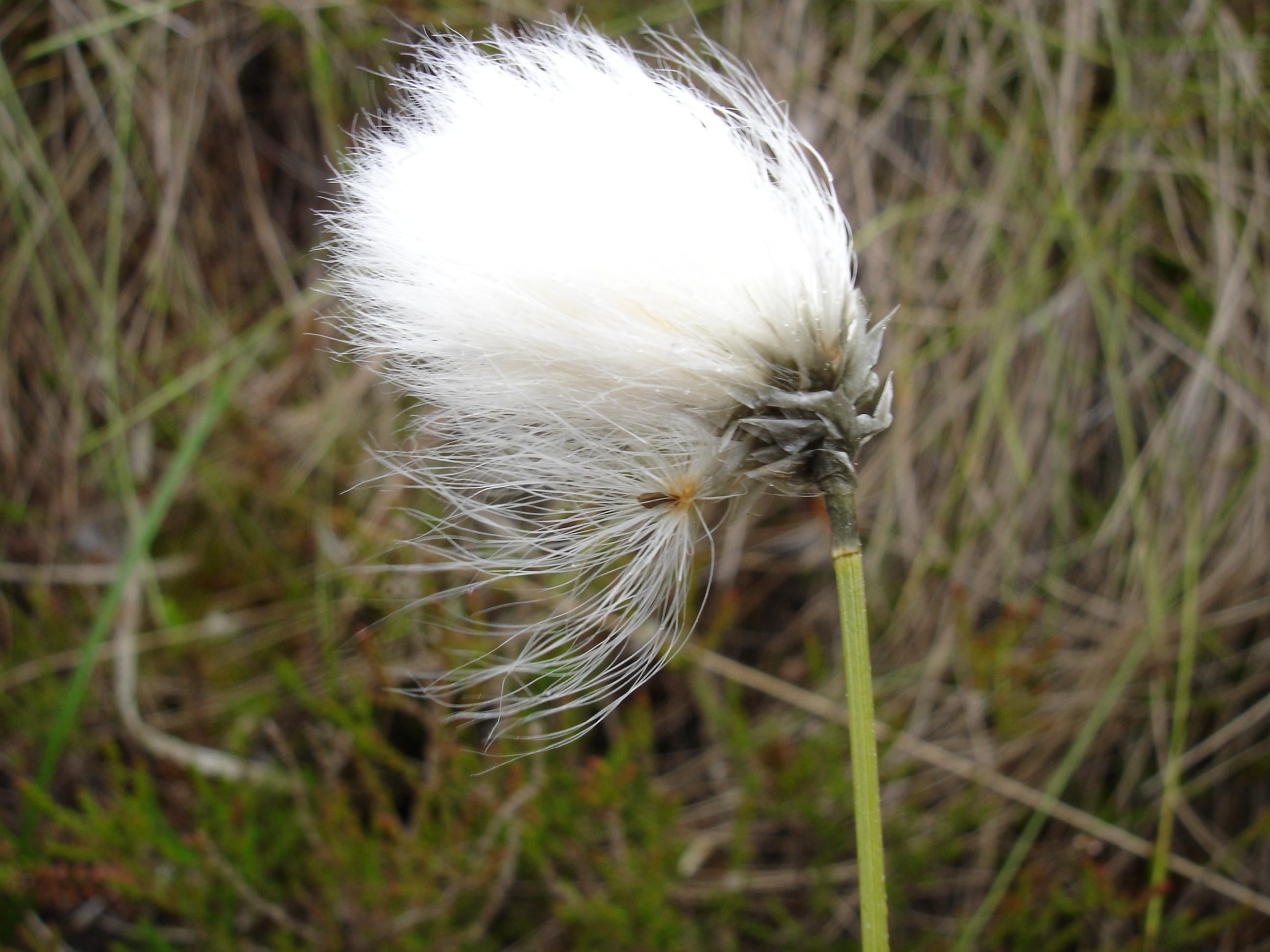
Fruiting head, in Gothenburg, Sweden (June 11)

For identification purposes, the cottongrasses divide into two groups based on the number of spikelets. Eriophorum vaginatum is a member of the unispicate group since it has one (not multiple) spikelets. It is similar in appearance to the unispicate species Eriophorum brachyantherum and Eriophorum callitrix. All three species have densely tufted stems (cespitose) and 10 or more empty scales at the base of the inflorescence. Eriophorum vaginatum is distinguished by having white-margined empty scales with the lowermost scales spreading or reflexed (not appressed to ascending), a conspicuously inflated sheath, and a tussock-forming growth habit.

Eriophorum vaginatum subsp. spissum is very similar to the typical subspecies described above, differing in a few characters only:

	Eriophorum vaginatum subsp. vaginatum	Eriophorum vaginatum subsp. spissum
Stem	up to 60 cm (24 in) tall	up to 20 cm (7.9 in) tall
Inflorescence	spikelet oblong, becoming more or less globular	mature spikelet globose to depressed-globose
Scales	lead-colored, translucent	with a darker center
Flowers	anthers to 3 mm long	anthers at most 2 mm long

Subspecies spissum is a smaller plant with a more compact tussock. It occurs throughout northeastern North America but the full extent of its range is unknown.

== Taxonomy ==
Eriophorum vaginatum, the type species of genus Eriophorum, was first described by the Swedish botanist Carl Linnaeus in 1753. Linnaeus based his diagnosis on specimens with smooth sheathed culms collected in the cold, barren regions of Europe.

In 1926, the American botanist Merritt Lyndon Fernald named and described Eriophorum spissum as a segregate taxon of Eriophorum vaginatum in northeastern North America. In 1942, the Swedish botanist Oskar Eric Gunnar Hultén reduced Eriophorum spissum to a subspecies, and in 1967, the Canadian botanist Joseph Robert Bernard Boivin further reduced it to a variety. As of March 2026, the name Eriophorum vaginatum subsp. spissum (Fernald) Hultén is accepted by some authorities, while others accept the name Eriophorum vaginatum var. spissum (Fernald) B.Boivin. Still others accept a broadly defined Eriophorum vaginatum L.

Hultén claimed that the two taxa were largely sympatric in Alaska and Yukon, and that the range of subspecies spissum extended westward at least as far as the Lena River in Siberia. He concluded that the distinction between the taxa was unclear at best. His work influenced Flora of North America to recognize a single taxon in 2002.

Fernald simultaneously published the names Eriophorum spissum and Eriophorum spissum var. erubescens in 1926. The latter was first described as Eriophorum callitrix var. erubescens by Fernald in 1905 based on a specimen collected in Newfoundland. The epithet erubescens, which means "turning red", refers to the color of the perianth bristles. In 1951, the Canadian botanist Louis-Florent-Marcel Raymond described a hybrid of Eriophorum russeolum and Eriophorum vaginatum subsp. spissum, placing Eriophorum spissum var. erubescens (Fernald) Fernald in synonymy with the hybrid name. In 1992, Boivin reduced Eriophorum spissum var. erubescens to a form of Eriophorum vaginatum var. spissum. He listed Raymond's hybrid name as a synonym of the new form. As of March 2026, the accepted name of this taxon is Eriophorum × pylaieanum Raymond.

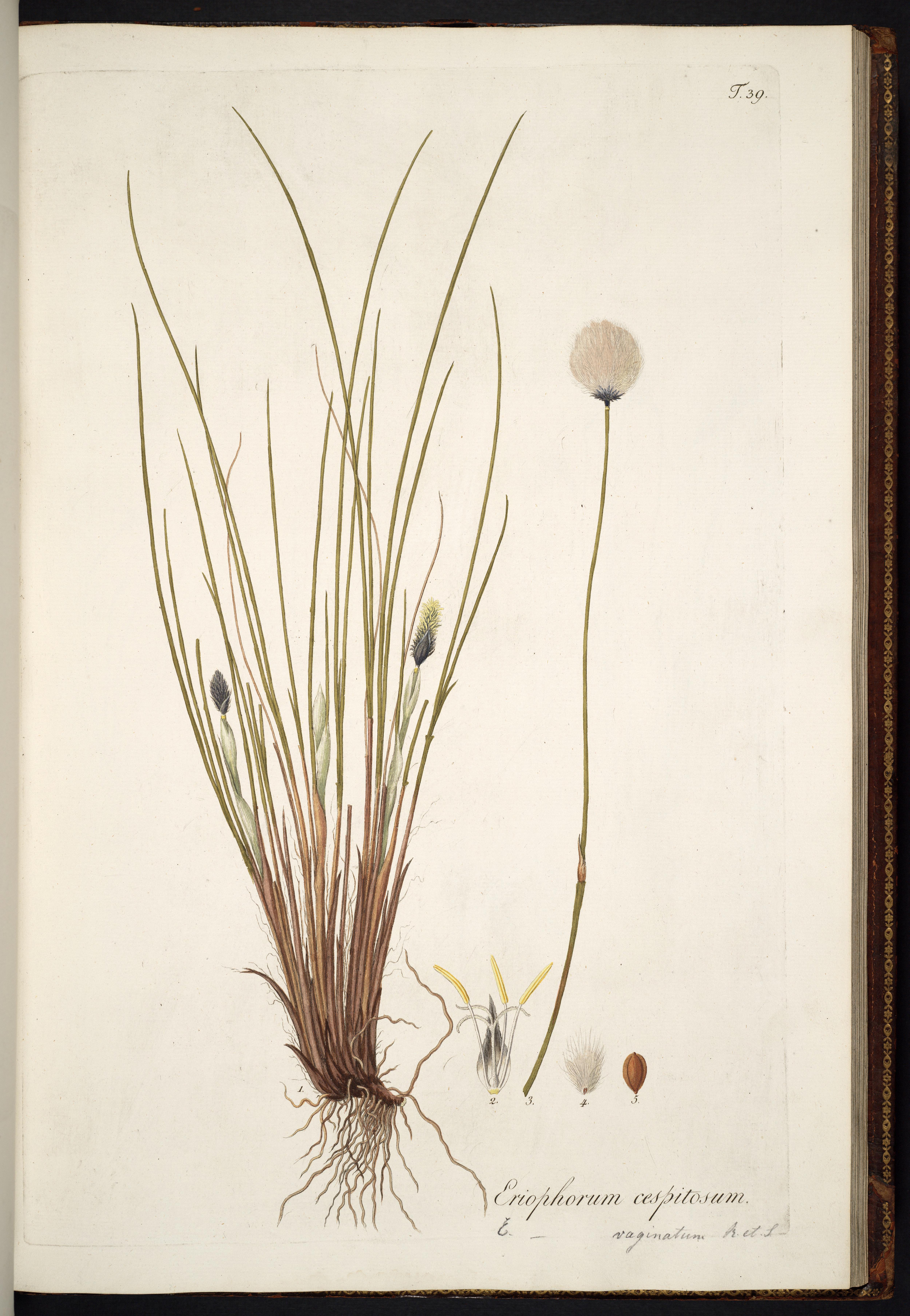
Synonym Eriophorum caespitosum Host, illustrated in 1801

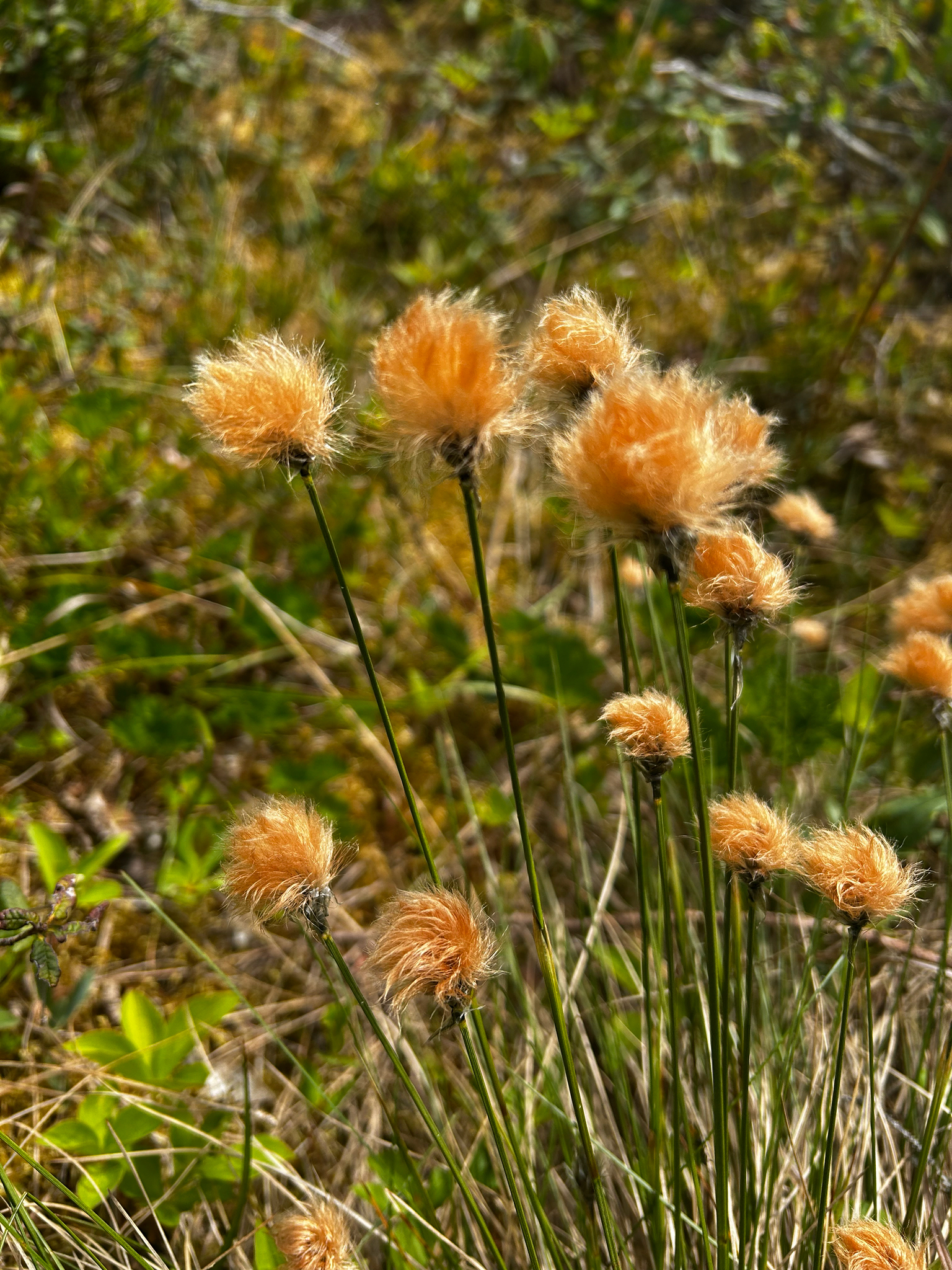
Hybrid Eriophorum × pylaieanum in Newfoundland, Canada (June 14)

=== Etymology ===
The specific epithet vaginatum, which means "having a sheath", refers to an important character used to recognize this species. Both the scientific name Eriophorum vaginatum and the common name "sheathed cottongrass" emphasize this fact. The epithet spissum, which means dense or crowded, evidently refers to the densely cespitose growth habit of this subspecies. In Canada, the subspecies is known as "dense cottongrass". In Britain and Ireland (and elsewhere), the species is referred to as "hare's-tail cottongrass" (or simply "hare's-tail"), a name also used by Fernald in 1950. The name "tussock cottongrass" gained in popularity after its publication in Flora of North America in 2002.

== Distribution and habitat ==
Eriophorum vaginatum occurs throughout the subarctic and temperate regions of the Northern Hemisphere. In Eurasia, its range extends from Spain in southwestern Europe to Japan in East Asia, northward to Siberia and Scandinavia. In North America, it occurs from Alaska south to British Columbia, east through the Great Lakes region to New England, and north through eastern Canada to Greenland. It prefers acidic, moist to wet, peaty soil and may be dominant in bogs, poor fens, and the heathlands of Western Europe. In the Arctic, it is commonly found in the peaty tundras of Russia and North America. It is common in Scotland where it is sometimes referred to as draw-ling or drawmoss.

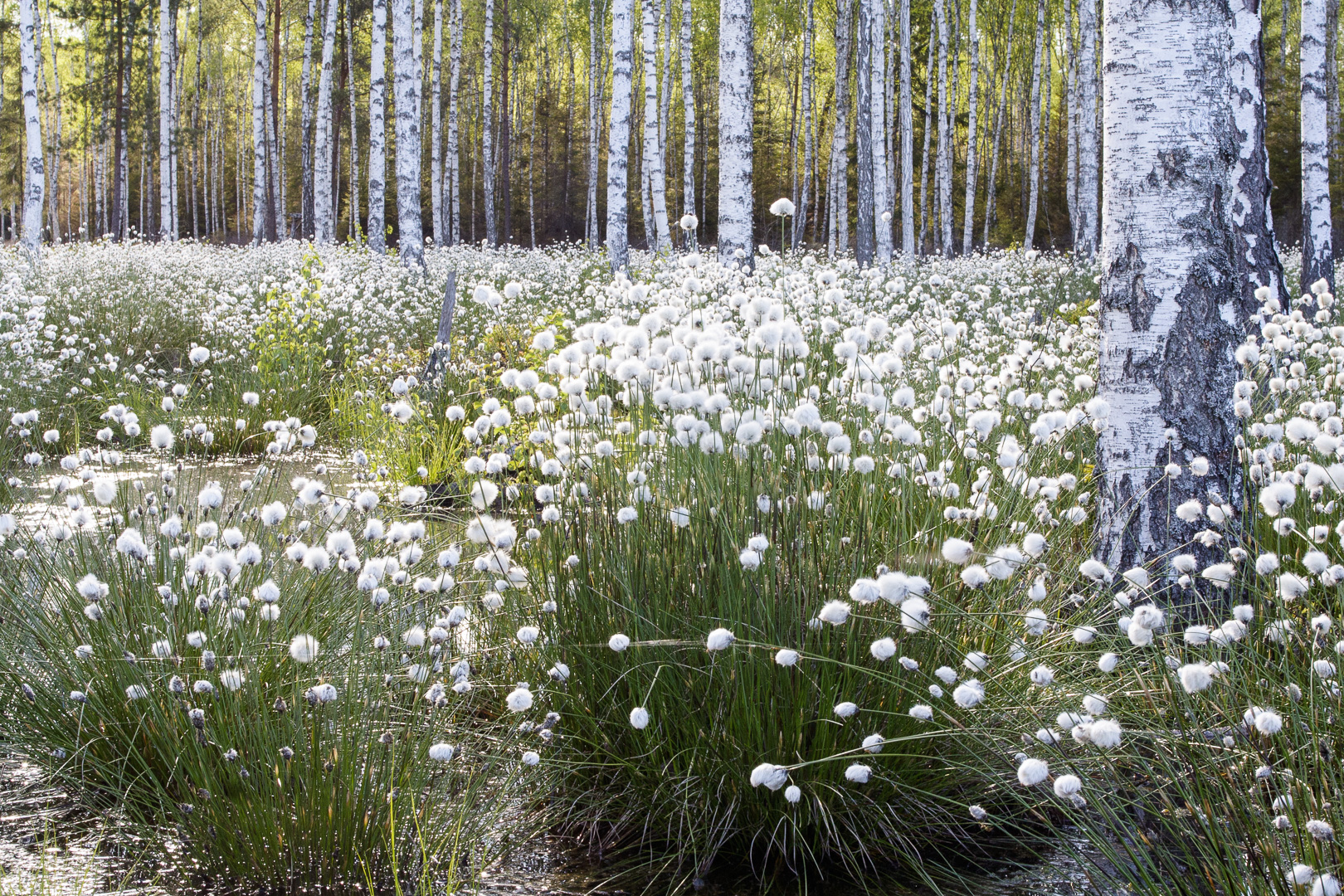

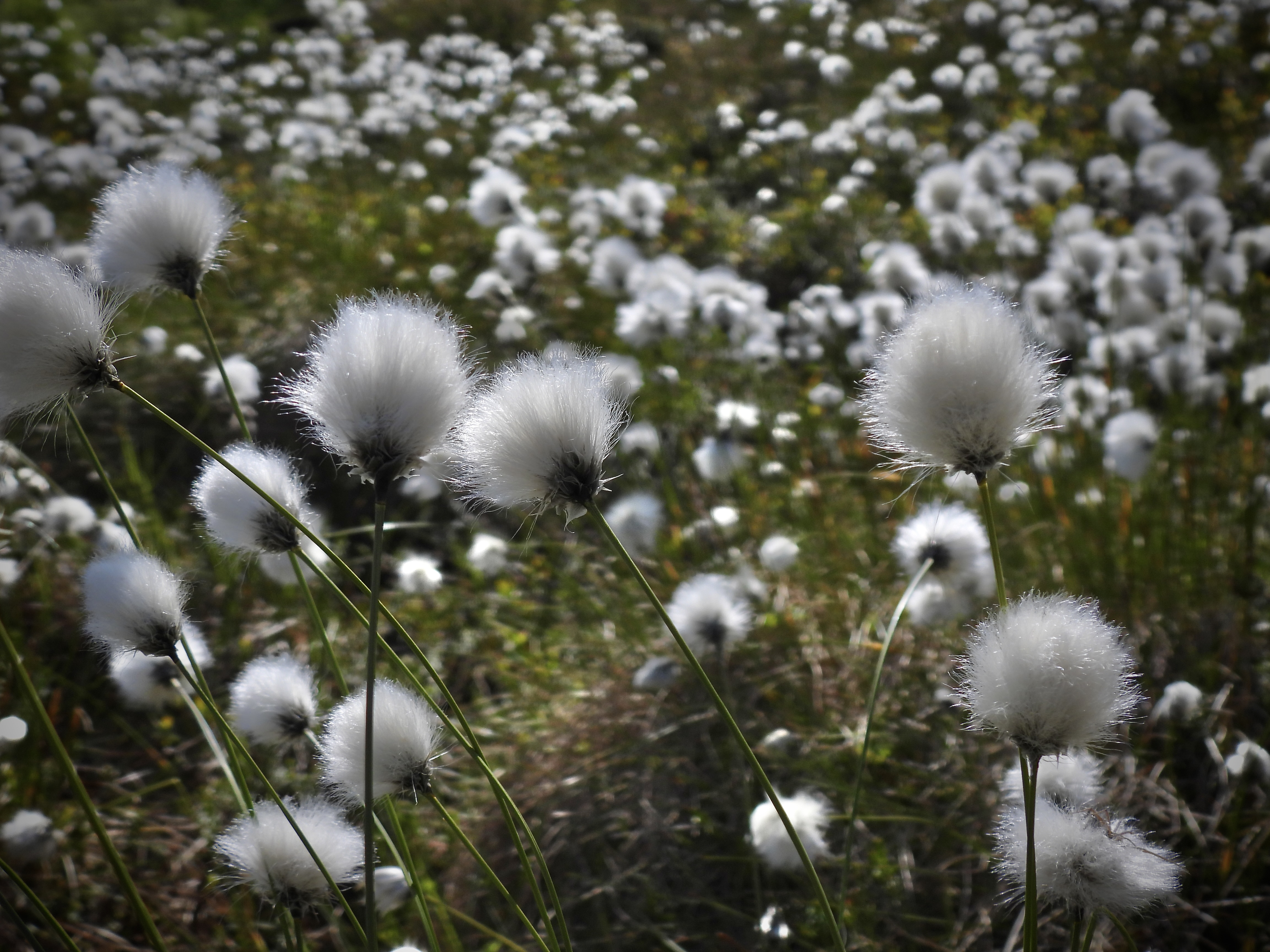

== Ecology ==
In Merionethshire, Wales, seasonal growth of Eriophorum vaginatum begins around mid-March and continues until the end of November. In the southern Pennines in Northern England, it is in full fruit by June. Peak flowering occurs in May but flowering can occur in April or even as early as March. In the northern Pennines, there is a second flowering period during September and October.

== Bibliography ==
- Boivin, Bernard (1992). Les Cypéracées de l'est du Canada (PDF). Provancheria No. 25. Québec: Université Laval.
- Fernald, M. L. (May 1905). "The North American species of Eriophorum. Part 1: Synopsis of American species". Rhodora. 7 (77): 81–92.
- Fernald, M. L. (1925). "The identity of Eriophorum callitrix". Rhodora. 27 (324): 203–210.
- Fernald, Merrit Lyndon (1970) [first published in 1950]. Rollins, R. C. (ed.). Gray's Manual of Botany (8th ed.). D. Van Nostrand Company. ISBN 0-442-22250-5.
- Gledhill, David (2008). The Names of Plants (4th ed.). Cambridge University Press. ISBN 978-0-521-86645-3.
- Haines, Arthur (2011). New England Wild Flower Society's Flora Novae Angliae: A Manual for the Identification of Native and Naturalized Higher Vascular Plants of New England. Illustrated by Elizabeth Farnsworth and Gordon Morrison. Yale University Press. ISBN 978-0-300-17154-9.
- Hultén, Eric (1968). Flora of Alaska and Neighboring Territories. Stanford University Press. ISBN 9780804706438.
- Linnaeus, Carl (1753). Species Plantarum: exhibentes plantas rite cognitas, ad genera relatas, cum differentiis specificis, nominibus trivialibus, synonymis selectis, locis natalibus, secundum systema sexuale digestas (1st ed.). Stockholm: Impensis Laurentii Salvii.
- Parker, Thomas C.; Unger, Steven L.; Moody, Michael L.; Tang, Jianwu; Fetcher, Ned (2022). "Intraspecific variation in phenology offers resilience to climate change for Eriophorum vaginatum". Arctic Science. 8 (3): 935–951. doi:10.1139/as-2020-0039. hdl:1912/66948.
- Scoggan, H. J. (1978). The Flora of Canada. National Museum of Natural Sciences (Canada).
- Tucker, G. C. (1987). "The genera of Cyperaceae in the southeastern United States". Journal of the Arnold Arboretum. 68 (4): 361–445. JSTOR 43782578.
- Wein, Ross W. (July 1973). "Eriophorum vaginatum L.". Journal of Ecology. 61 (2): 601–615. doi:10.2307/2259047. JSTOR 2259047.
