= Symbols of Nunavut =

Nunavut is one of Canada's territories, and has established several territorial symbols.

== Symbols of Nunavut ==
	Symbol	Image	Adopted	Remarks and references
Coat of arms	Coat of arms of Nunavut	Coat of arms of Nunavut	April 1, 1999	Contains symbols of the riches of land, sea and sky. The coat of arms was designed by Andrew Qappik.
Motto	Nunavut Sannginivut ᓄᓇᕗᑦ ᓴᙱᓂᕗᑦ; Nunavut, our strength		April 1, 1999	Granted with other elements of the coat of arms
Flag	Flag of Nunavut	Flag of Nunavut	April 1, 1999	Featuring colours and an inuksuk referring to the geography of Nunavut, as well as Polaris; The North Star; this flag was designed by the same artist as the territory's coat of arms, Andrew Qappik.
Mace	The Mace of Nunavut	Mace of the Legislative Assembly of Nunavut	March 30, 1999	It is the symbol of the authority of the Legislative Assembly. It is a ceremonial staff carried by the Serjeant-at-arms into the Chamber.
Flower	Purple Saxifrage; Saxifraga oppositifolia	Purple Saxifrage	May 1, 2000	One of the first plants to flower in the Arctic spring
Bird	Rock ptarmigan Aqilgiq ᐊᕐᑭᒡᒋᖅ ᐊᑕᔪᓕᒃ; Lagopus mutus	Bird: Rock Ptarmigan	May 1, 2000	Lives in Nunavut year round (Note: Prior to November 15, 2022, the Legislative Assembly of Nunavut listed both the rock ptarmigan and the Canadian Inuit Dog as official symbols. However, as of May 2024, they are no longer listed.)
Animal	Canadian Inuit Dog; Qimmiq ᕿᒻᒥᖅ; Canis familiaris borealis	Canadian Inuit Dog	May 1, 2000	Resident in the Arctic for at least 4000 years
Territorial symbol	Inuksuk; Inukhuk ᐃᓄᒃᓱᒃ; Inukshuk	Inuksuk		
Licence plate	Nunavut ᓄᓇᕗᑦ		July 2012	Standard North American rectangular plate

== Great Seal ==
Like Yukon, Nunavut does not have an official Great Seal.
