= Flag of Nunavut =

Canadian territorial flag

Nunavut
- Use: Civil and state flag
- Proportion: 9:16
- Adopted: 1 April 1999; 27 years ago
- Designed by: Andrew Qappik

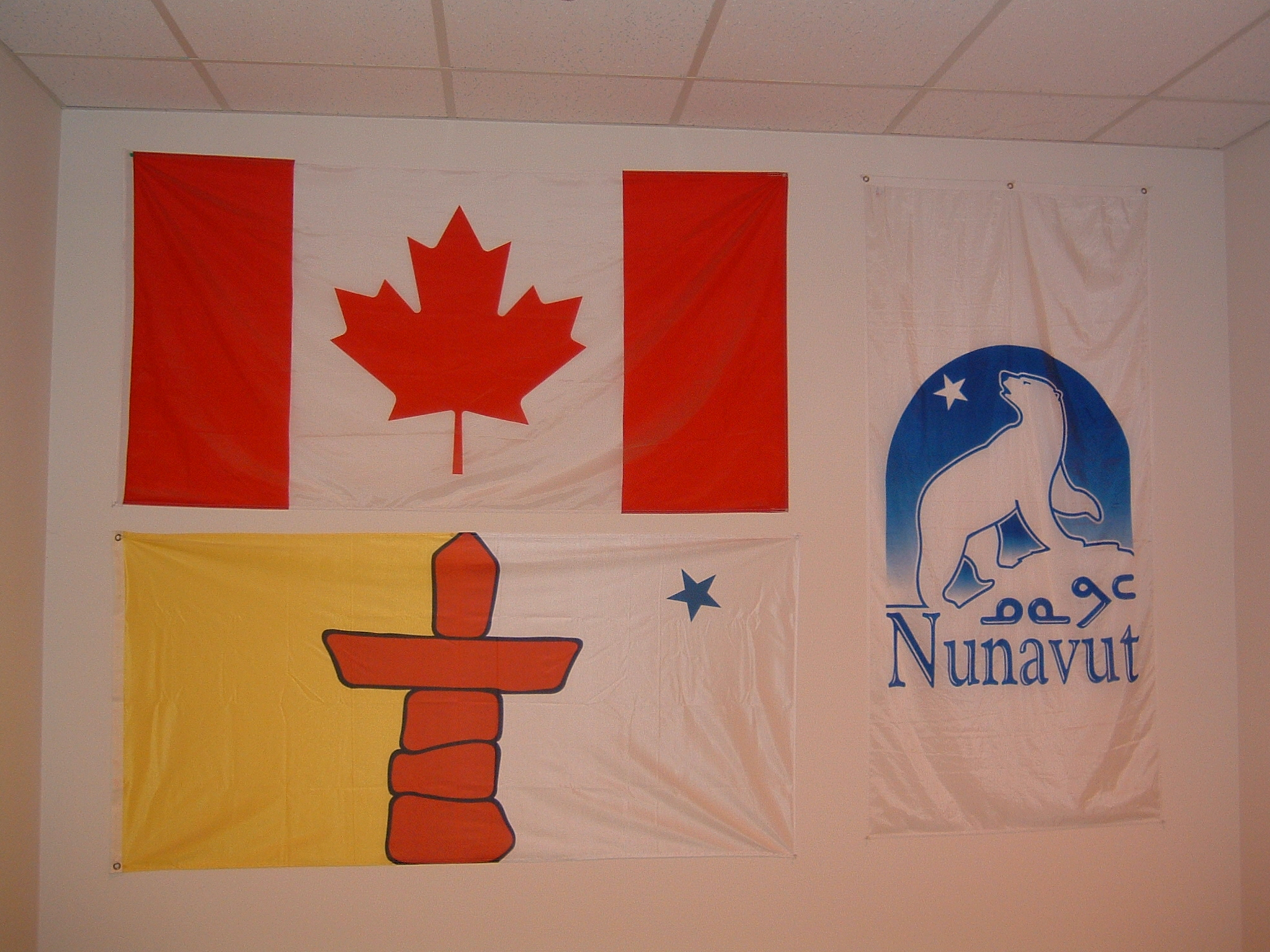
Nunavut flags displayed on a wall

The flag of Nunavut was proclaimed on 1 April 1999, along with the territory of Nunavut in Canada. It features a red inuksuk—a traditional Inuit land marker—and a blue star, which represents Niqirtsuituq (or 'Niqirtsituk'), the North Star, and the leadership of elders in the community. The colours blue and gold represent the riches of the land, sea and sky. It was adopted following a process where input was sought from local communities and submissions were solicited from the Canadian public.

== Symbolism ==
The flag of the Canadian territory of Nunavut consists of gold and white fields divided vertically by a red inuksuk with a blue star in the upper fly. The colours blue and gold were selected to represent the "riches of land, sea, and sky", while red is used to represent Canada as a whole. The inuksuk, which divides the flag, is a traditional stone monument used to guide travellers and to mark sacred sites. In the upper fly, the blue star represents the North Star (Niqirtsituk / Niqirtsuituq), an important object due to its key role as a navigational beacon, and as symbolically representing the wisdom and leadership of community elders.

=== Colour scheme ===
The flag of Nunavut has the following four primary colours and black outlining the inuksuk;

Colour scheme	Gold	Red	White	Blue	Black
CMYK	0-15-99-1	0-82-95-16	0-0-0-0	100-47-0-26	0-0-0-100
HEX	#FDD602	#D6270B	#FFFFFF	#0164BC	#000000
RGB	253-214-2	214-39-11	255-255-255	0-100-188	0-0-0

== History ==
The process of creating a flag for Nunavut began prior to its creation as a territory in 1999. This created significant excitement in the vexillographic community, as it was the first change in the map of Canada since Newfoundland became a province in 1949 and was being created in a region with little flag history. In deference to the elders of the Inuit communities of Nunavut, the development of both the Nunavut flag and coat of arms was guided by their input. The process sought to give the public an opportunity to offer input into the colours and symbolism of the flag as well as to give local artists an opportunity to participate. Led by the Chief Herald of Canada, a group developing the flag visited a number of communities to seek input and learn about Inuit culture, including Rankin Inlet, Baker Lake, Kinngait, Iqaluit, and Pangnirtung.

The group then put out a call for submissions across all of Canada, and received over 800. These submissions were reviewed and winnowed by a committee made up of artists and local elders who chose ten finalists. From the symbols and colours of these ten finalists, five draft designs of the flag were developed. They were assisted in drafting these by local Inuk artist Andrew Qappik. The final version of the flag was reviewed and accepted by the commission responsible for its adoption as well as the Governor General of Canada and Queen Elizabeth II. It was officially unveiled on 1 April 1999, the day when both the territory and government of Nunavut became official.

The layout and colouring of the flag have aroused some marginal criticism, which nonetheless recognized the valuable cultural symbolism included in the design.

== See also ==
- Symbols of Nunavut
- Coat of arms of Nunavut
- List of Canadian provincial and territorial symbols
