= Qulliq =

Traditional oil lamp used by Arctic peoples

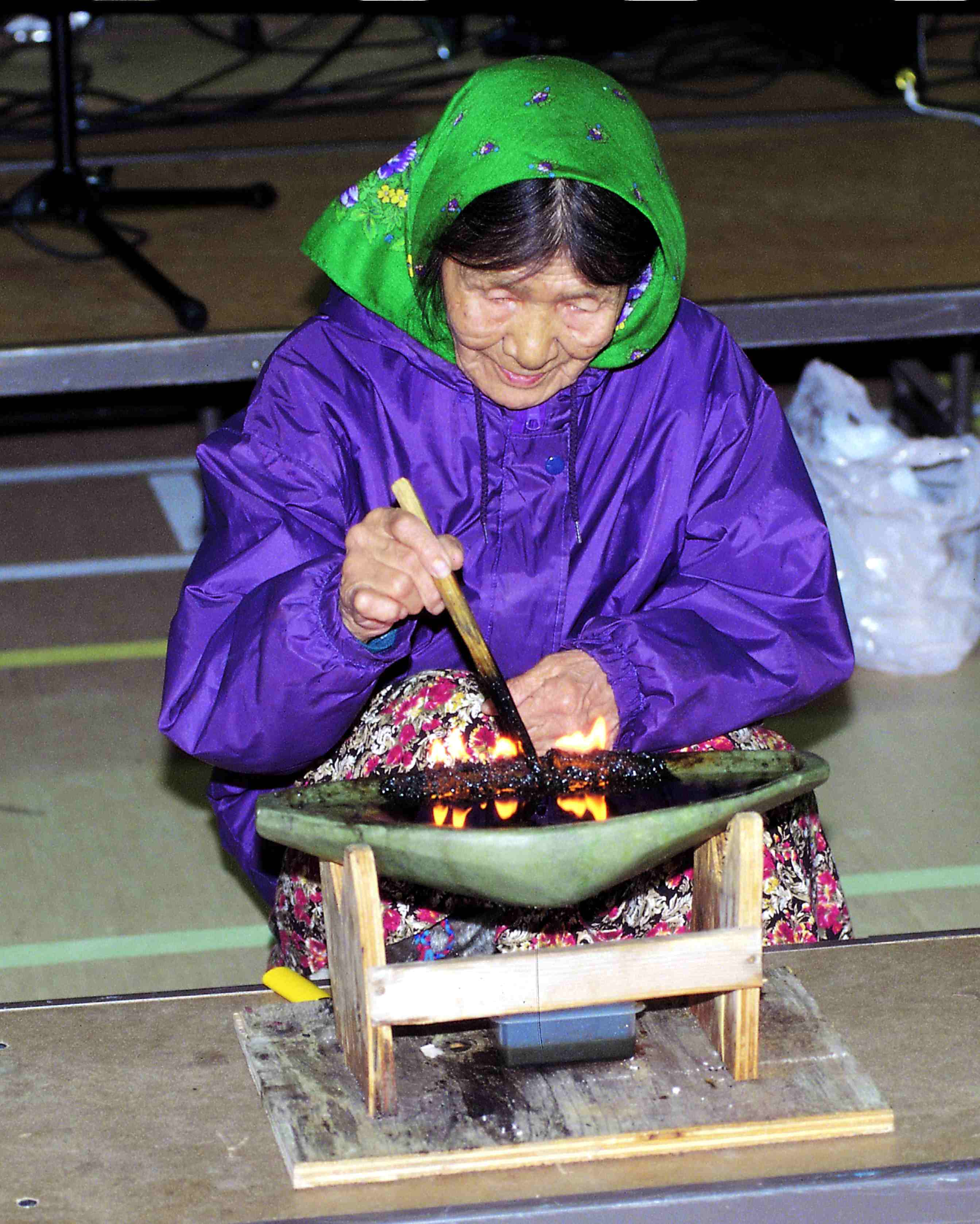
A qulliq being lit, Nunavut, 1999

The qulliq or kudlik (Inuktitut: ᖁᓪᓕᖅ, romanized: qulliq, IPA: [qulːiq]; Greenlandic: qulleq; Inupiaq: naniq) is the traditional oil lamp used by many circumpolar peoples, including the Inuit, the Chukchi and the Yupik peoples. The fuel is seal-oil or blubber, and the lamp is made of soapstone. A qulliq is lit with a stick called a taqqut.

This characteristic type of oil lamp provided warmth and light in the harsh Arctic environment where there was no wood (other than driftwood far too valuable as a material to burn for heat or light) and where the sparse inhabitants relied almost entirely on seal oil or on whale blubber as fuel. This lamp was the single most important article of furniture for Inuit in their dwellings.

== History ==
It is uncertain in which period the seal-oil lamps began to be used. They are part of a series of technological innovations among the Arctic peoples whose introduction and spread has been partly documented. Oil lamps have been found in sites of Paleo-Eskimo communities dating back to the time of the Norton tradition, 3,000 years ago. They were a common implement of the Dorset culture and of the Thule people, the lamps manufactured then showing little changes compared with more recent ones.

In Inuit religion, the story the Sun and the Moon involves the Sun carrying a qulliq oil lamp.

Among the Netsilik if the people breached certain taboos, Nuliajuk, the Sea Woman, held the marine mammal in the basin of her lamp. When this happened the angakkuq had to visit her to beg for game. This story also inspired a New Year or Quviasukvik tradition in which three lamps were extinguished and relit during the first sunrise.

Historically, the lamp was a multi-purpose tool. The Arctic peoples used the lamp for illuminating and heating their tents, semi-subterranean houses and igloos, as well as for melting snow, cooking, and drying their clothes.

In present times such lamps are mainly used for ceremonial purposes. Owing to its cultural significance, a qulliq is featured on the coat of arms of Nunavut.

A qulliq was lit to commence the investiture ceremony of Mary Simon, the first Inuk, and indigenous person, to be appointed to the position of Governor General of Canada, in the Senate Chamber, 26 July 2021.

The Qulleq party in Greenland is named after the lamp.

== Description and use ==
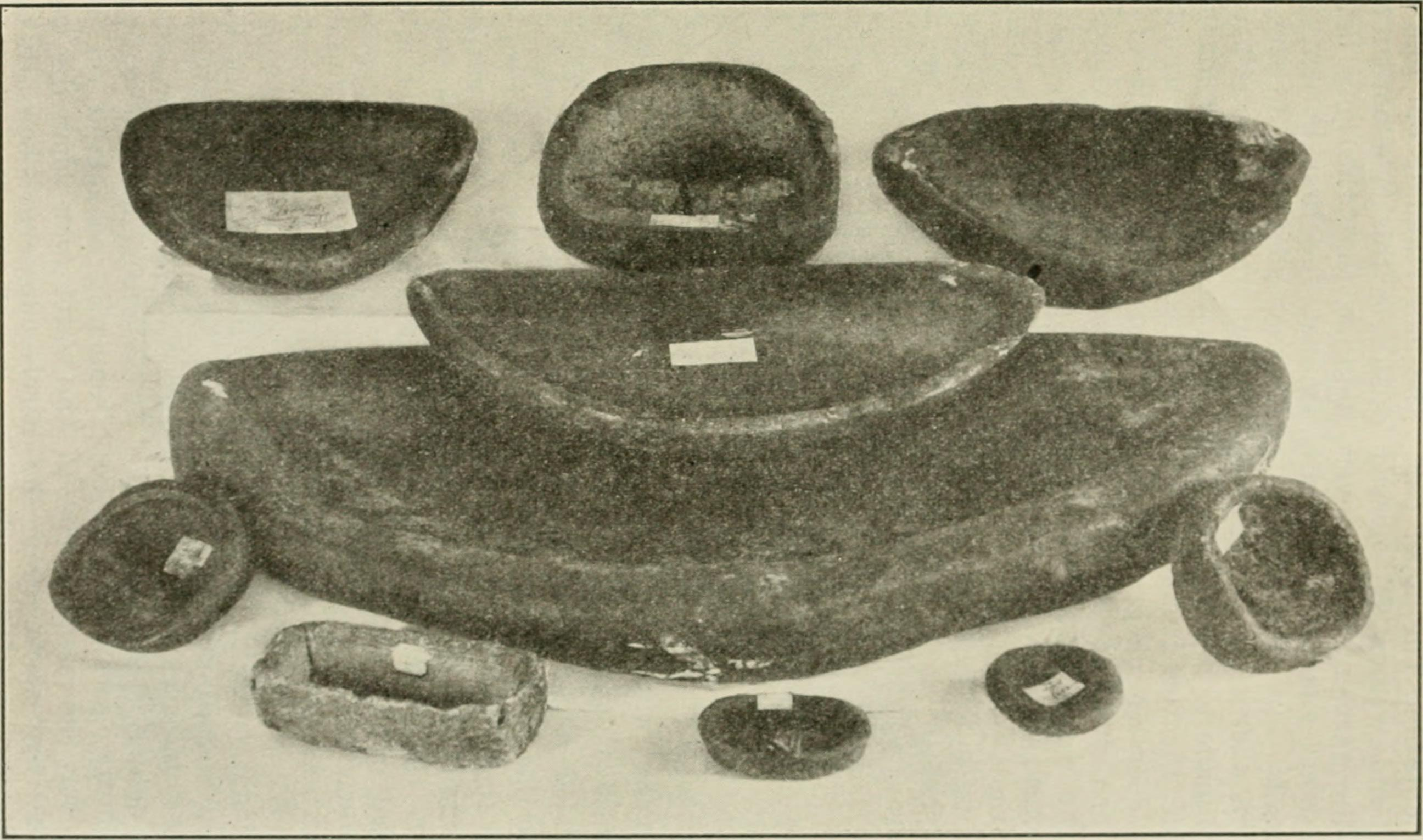
Seal oil lamps

The Inuit oil lamps were made mainly of soapstone, but there are also some made of a special kind of pottery. Sizes and shapes of lamps could be different, but most were either elliptical or half-moon shaped. The taqquti or wick trimmers, also known as lamp feeders, were made of wood, willow, soapstone, bone or ivory.

The wick was mostly made of Arctic cottongrass (suputi), common cottongrass and/or dried moss (ijju/maniq Inupiaq: peqaq) It was lit along the edge of the lamp, providing a pleasant light. A slab of seal blubber could be left to melt over the lamp feeding it with more fat. These lamps had to be tended continually by trimming the wick in such a way that the lamp would not produce smoke.

Although such lamps were usually filled with seal blubber and the English term 'seal-oil lamp' is common in writings about Arctic peoples, they could also be filled with whale blubber in communities where there was whaling. However, the term 'whale oil lamp' refers to a different kind of lighting device. Generally caribou fat was a poor choice, as was the fat of other land animals, seal oil being a more efficient fuel for the lamp. Women used to scrape the skin of a freshly skinned seal with an ulu in order not to waste any fat. Once the seal skin was stretched and dried it would be scraped using a halukhit to remove the dried fat.

Realizing that these lamps were such an important fixture of the Inuit household that "when the family moved the lamp went along with it", Arctic explorer William Edward Parry (1790–1855) commented:

The fire belonging to each family consists of a single lamp or shallow vessel of lapis ollaris, its form being the lesser segment of a circle. The wick, composed of dry moss rubbed between the hands until it is quite inflammable, is disposed along the edge of the lamp...

== Gallery ==
Qulliq and tools
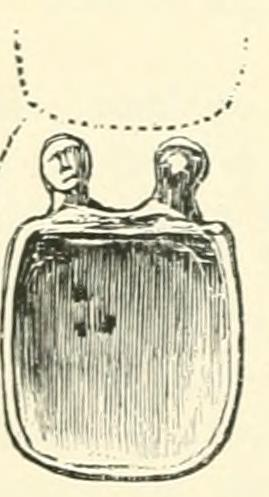
Ivory lamp feeder

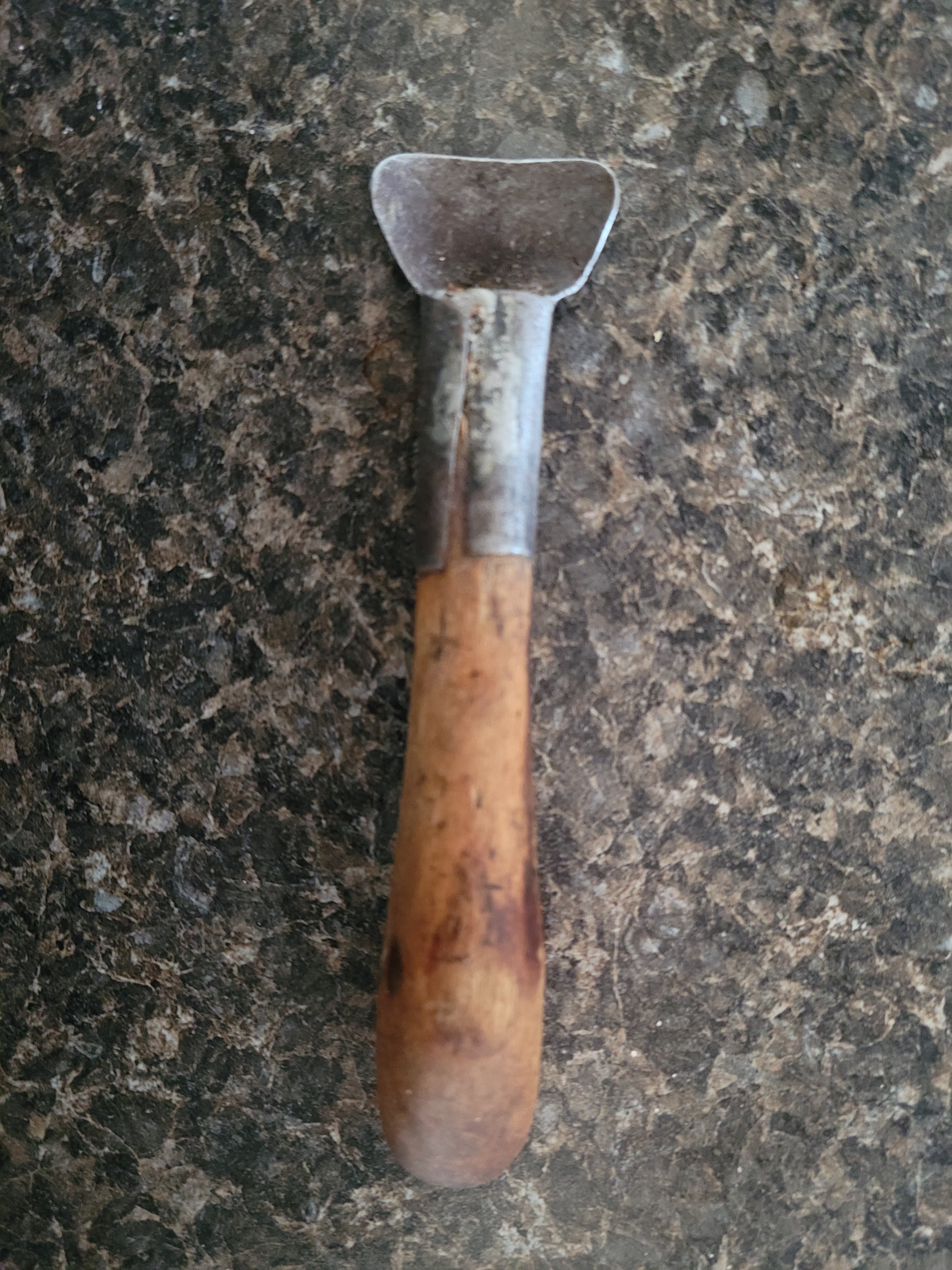
A halukhit or sharp scraper used to remove dried fat from a seal skin

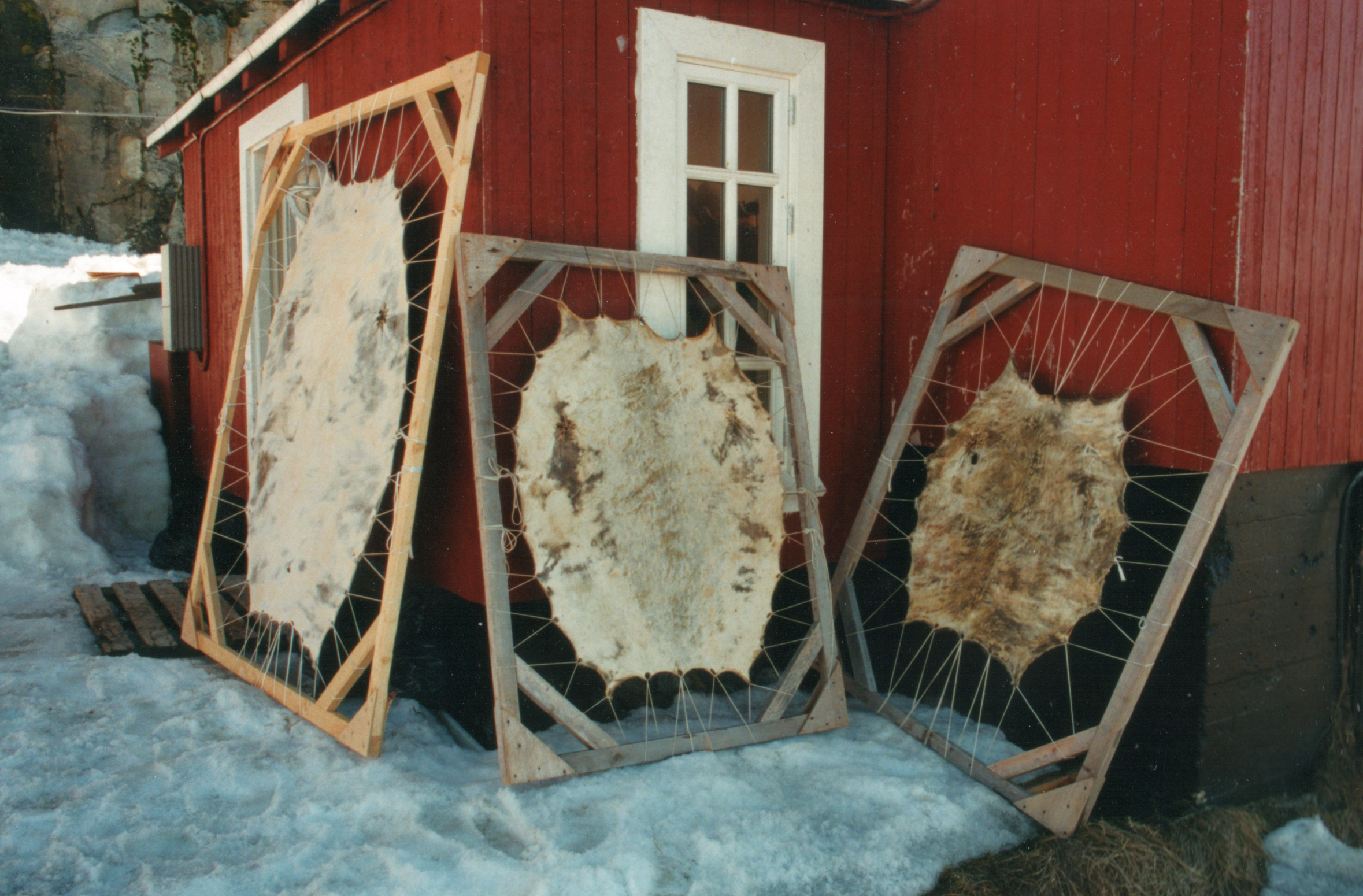
Seal drying before being scraped with a halukhit

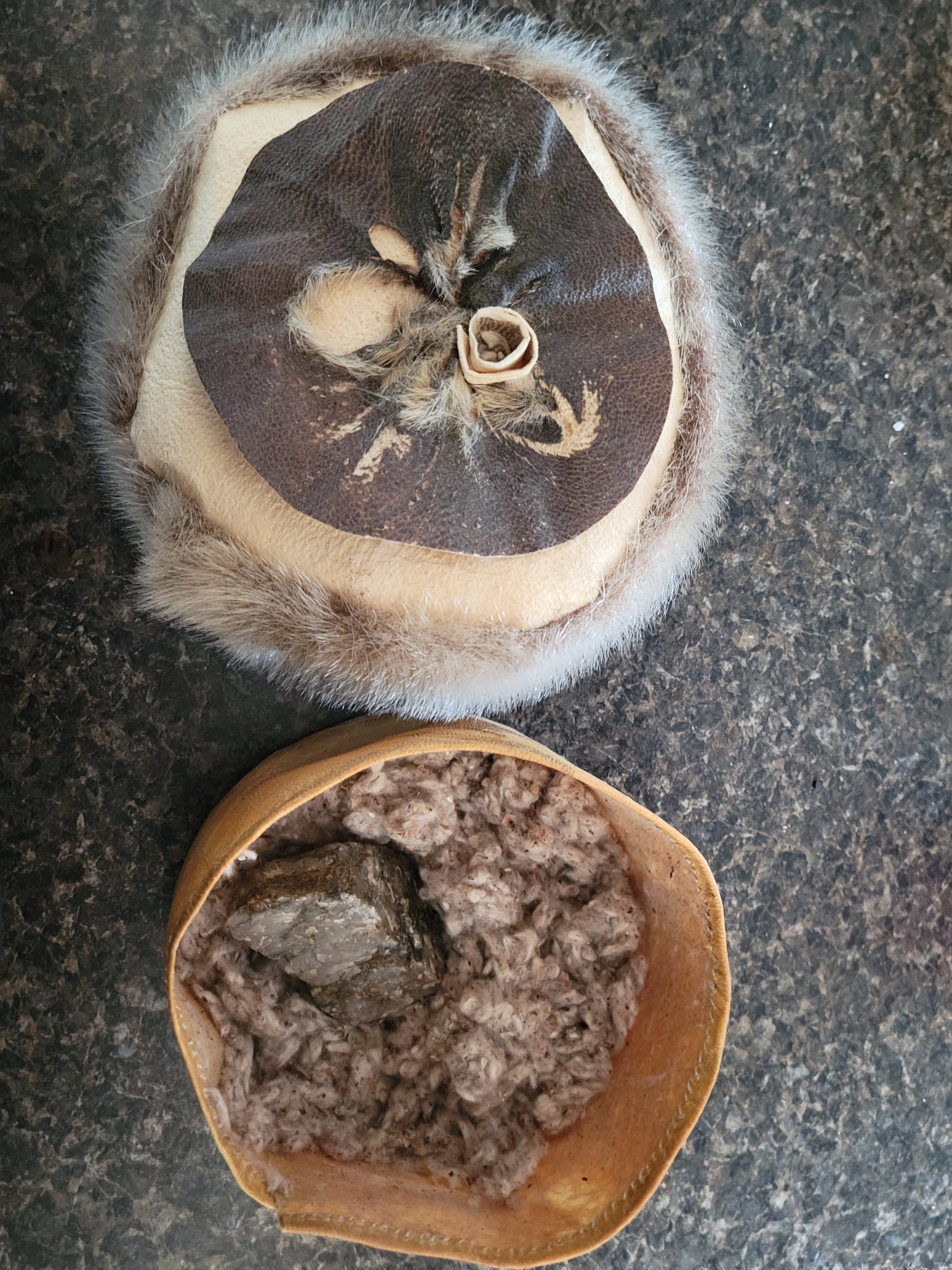
Home made tinder box with cotton. This would be used for the wick.

Coat of arms of Nunavut, featuring a stylized lit qulliq next to a blue inuksuk
