= Inukshuk (Kanak) =

Sculpture by Alvin Kanak in Vancouver, British Columbia, Canada

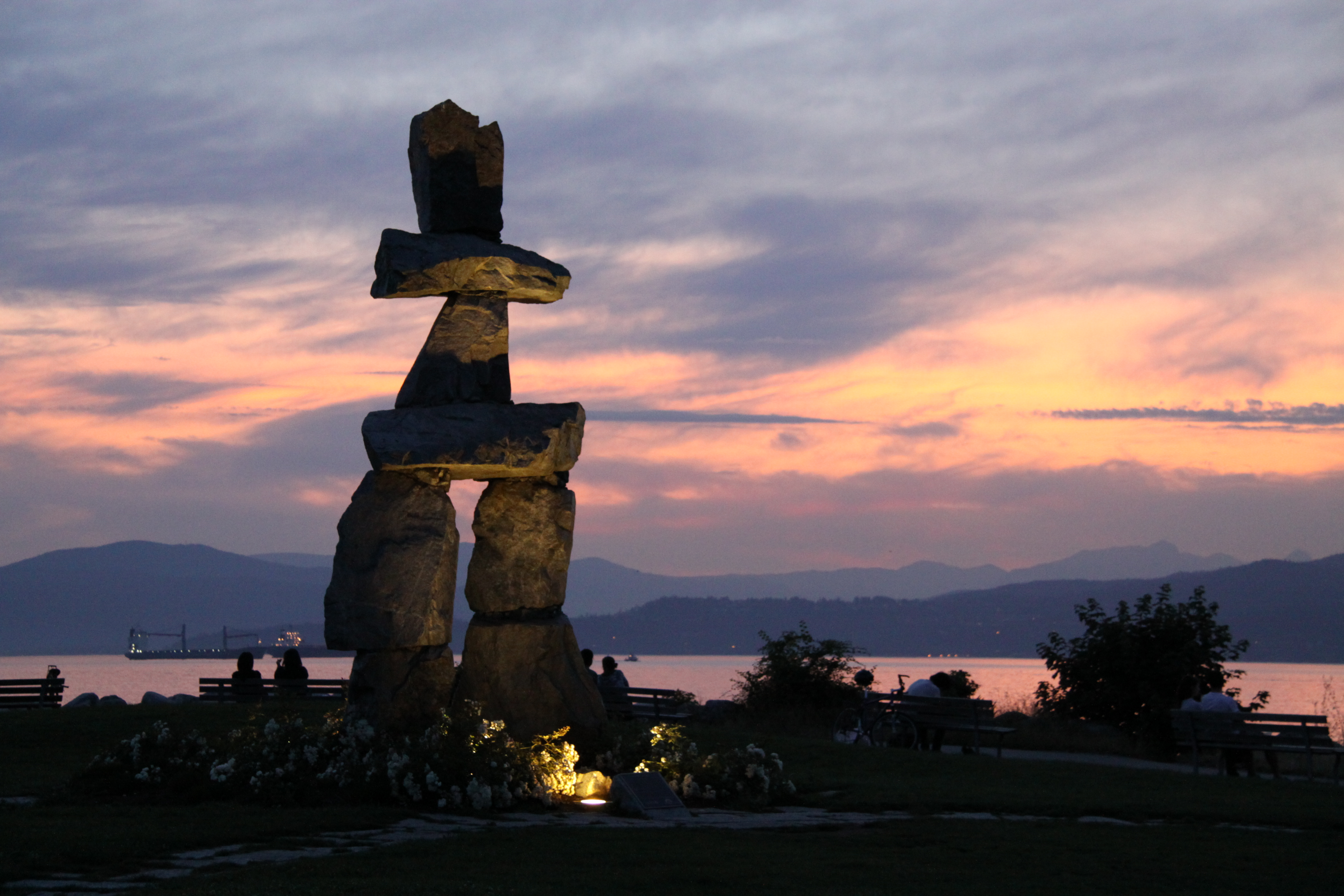
- Sunset on the inuksuk at English Bay, Vancouver, B.C.
- Artist: Alvin Kanak
- Location: Vancouver, British Columbia, Canada; 49°17′04″N 123°08′37″W

Inukshuk is an outdoor inuksuk by Alvin Kanak, installed at Vancouver's English Bay, in British Columbia. It stands 6 metres tall and weighs approximately 31,500 kilograms.

The inuksuk's base has a tablet recording that it was constructed in grey granite, and was commissioned by the government of the Northwest Territories for its pavilion at Expo 86, and later given to the City of Vancouver.

An inunnguaq is the basis of the logo of the 2010 Winter Olympics designed by Vancouver artist Elena Rivera MacGregor. Its use in this context has been controversial among the Inuit, and the First Nations within British Columbia. Although the design has been questioned, people believe it pays tribute to Alvin Kanak's 1986 inuksuk at English Bay. Friendship and the welcoming of the world are the meanings of both the English Bay structure and the 2010 Winter Olympics emblem.

A plaque near the work reads: "This ancient symbol of the Inuit culture is traditionally used as a landmark and navigational aid and also represents northern hospitality and friendship. Constructed of grey granite by Alvin Kanak of Rankin Inlet, this monument was commissioned by the Government of the Northwest Territories for its Pavilion at EXPO '86 and later given to the city of Vancouver. In 1987 the Inukshuk was moved to this site and sponsored as a gift to the City by Coast Hotels & Resorts through the Vancouver Legacies program."
