= Coat of arms of Nunavut =

Canadian territorial symbol

Arms of Nunavut
- Adopted: 1999; 26 years ago
- Crest: On a wreath argent and azure an iglu affronty argent windowed Or and ensigned by the Royal Crown proper;
- Torse: Argent and azure
- Shield: Or dexter a qulliq sable inflamed gules sinister an inuksuk azure on a chief also azure above five bezants in arc reversed issuant from the lower chief a mullet (Niqirtsuituq) Or
- Supporters: Dexter a caribou sinister a narwhal both proper
- Compartment: Dexter of land set with Arctic poppies, dwarf fireweed and Arctic heather proper sinister ice floes argent set on barry wavy azure and argent
- Motto: ᓄᓇᕗᑦ ᓴᙱᓂᕗᑦ; Our Land, Our Strength

The coat of arms of Nunavut was granted by a warrant of Roméo LeBlanc, Governor General of Canada, dated 31 March 1999, one day before the territory of Nunavut, Canada, was created. The same document specified the flag of Nunavut.

== Overview ==
The symbol was designed in collaboration with Inuit elders, leaders, artists, groups, and the general population of the territory. Each symbol was chosen individually from the 800 submissions for the flag and coat of arms that were received. Five draft designs were created in collaboration between the heraldic artist at the Canadian Heraldic Authority and Andrew Qappik, an Inuk artist from Pangnirtung.

The shield is blue and gold, symbolizing the riches of the land. According to the blazon, the shield should be presented on a roundel shaped shield, rather than the traditional escutcheon shape in European heraldry. In chief is a representation of the midnight sun and of the North Star, or Niqirtsuituk. Below are a qulliq, a stone lamp representing the warmth of home and community, and an inuksuk (inukhuk, inukshuk), a stone monument serving as a guidepost and a symbol of the territory.

The crest, an igloo (iglu), represents traditional life, survival, and the Nunavut government assembled in the legislature. It is ensigned with a crown representing royal sovereignty.

The supporters, a caribou and narwhal, represent sustenance and natural resources of the land and sea. They stand on a compartment with Arctic poppies, dwarf fireweed, and Arctic heather, alongside an iceberg at sea.

The motto, written in Inuktitut syllabary, is Nunavut Sannginivut (ᓄᓇᕗᑦ ᓴᙱᓂᕗᑦ, or, Our Land, Our Strength).

The letters patent are quite unique, having been presented in English, French, Inuktitut, and Inuinnaqtun.

== Blazon ==
Heraldic blazon describes the coat of arms of Nunavut as:

On a circular shield: Or Dexter a qulliq Sable inflamed Gules sinister an inuksuk Azure on a chief also Azure above five bezants in arc reversed issuant from the lower chief a mullet Niqirtsuituq Or;
And for a Crest: On a wreath Argent and Azure an iglu affronty Argent windowed Or and ensigned by the Royal Crown proper;
and for a Motto: ᓄᓇᕗᑦ ᓴᙱᓂᕗᑦ, meaning "Nunavut Our Strength";
and for Supporters: On a compartment dexter of Land set with Arctic poppies, dwarf fireweed and Arctic heather proper sinister ice floes Argent set on barry wavy Azure and Argent dexter a caribou sinister a narwhal both proper.

== Gallery ==
The arms of Nunavut is depicted on a traditional round shield

The Badge for the Commissioner of Nunavut

The crest of Nunavut is an igloo royally crowned

== See also ==
- Coat of arms of the Northern Territory, an Australian example of territorial arms reposing heavily on indigenous imagery
- List of Canadian provincial and territorial symbols
- Symbols of Nunavut
