= Bill Nasogaluak =

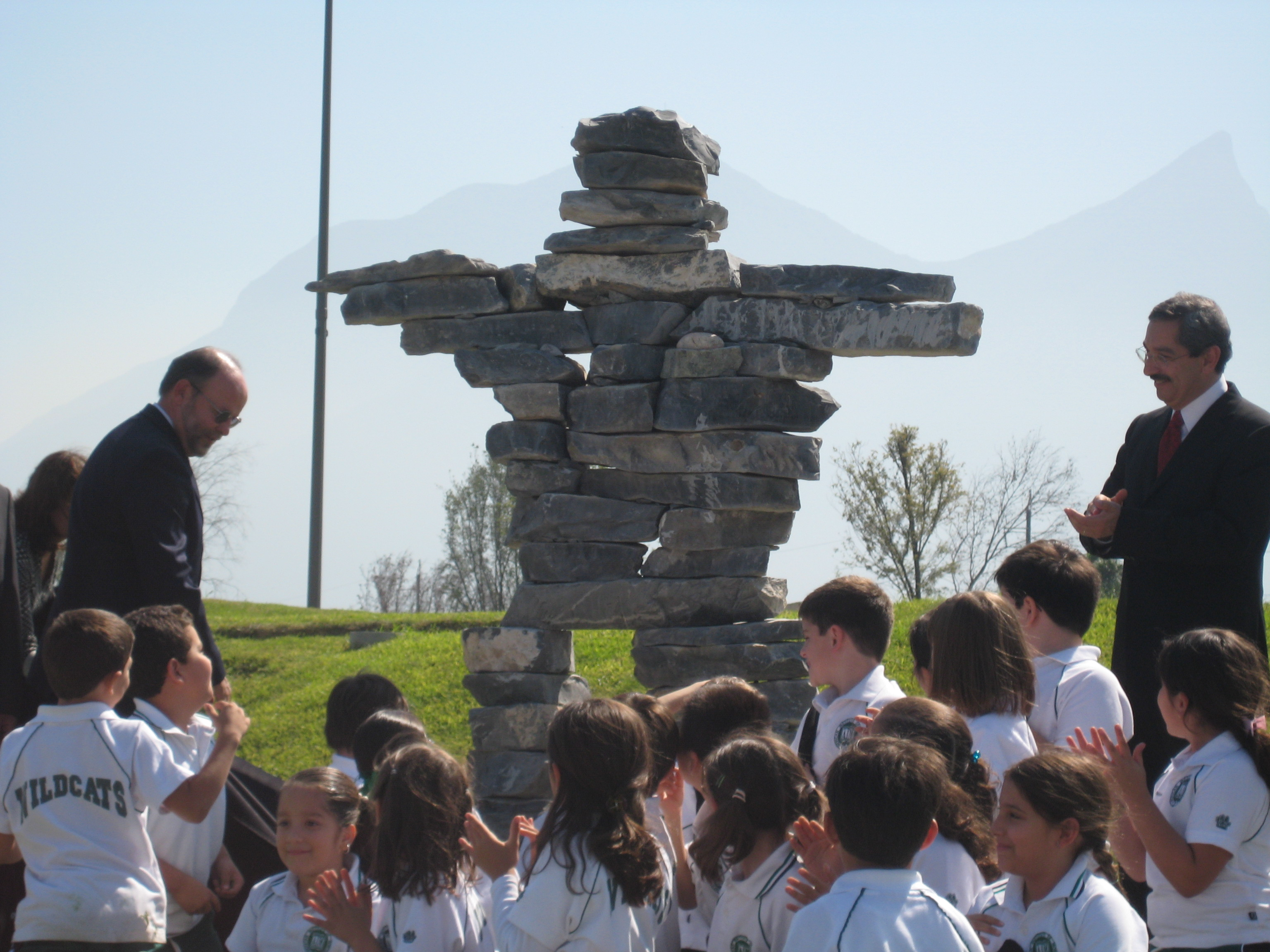
Inukshuk built by Nasogaluak in Monterrey, Mexico

Bill Nasogaluak (born 1953) is an Inuvialuk painter and sculptor from Tuktoyaktuk, in Canada's Northwest Territories.

Nasogaluak's works focus on Inuvialuit culture and commentary on Inuit life. Nasogaluak is also a snow sculptor.

== Selected works ==
- Sedna on Cross (2006)
- W.3-1258 documenting the Inuit Disc number system
