= Inuksuk =

Inuit built stone landmark or cairn

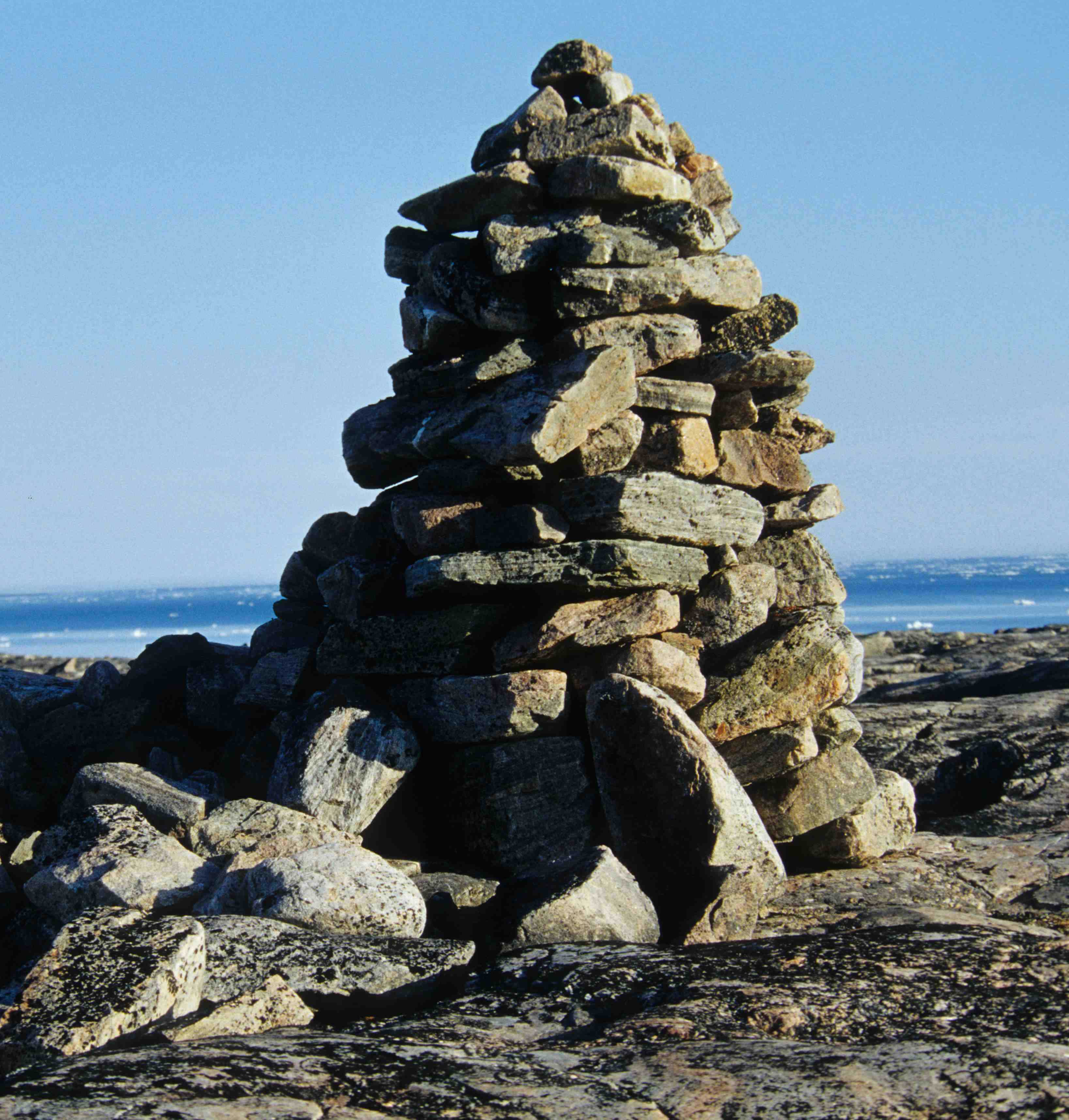
An inuksuk at the Foxe Peninsula, Nunavut, Canada

An inuksuk (plural inuksuit) or inukshuk (Note: From the Inuktitut: ᐃᓄᒃᓱᒃ, plural ᐃᓄᒃᓱᐃᑦ; alternatively inukhuk in Inuinnaqtun, iñuksuk in Iñupiaq, inussuk in Greenlandic) is a type of stone landmark or cairn built and used by Inuit, including Iñupiat, Kalaallit, Yupik, and other related Indigenous peoples of the North American Arctic. These structures are found in northern Canada, Greenland, and Alaska. This combined region, north of the Arctic Circle, is dominated by the tundra biome and has areas with few natural landmarks.

The inuksuk may historically have been used for navigation, as a point of reference, a marker for travel routes, fishing places, camps, hunting grounds, places of veneration, drift fences used in hunting, or to mark a food cache. The Iñupiat in northern Alaska used inuksuit to assist in the herding of caribou into contained areas for slaughter. Varying in shape and size, the inuksuit have ancient roots in Inuit culture.

Historically, the most common types of inuksuit are built with stone placed upon stone. The simplest type is a single stone positioned in an upright manner. The size of some inuksuit suggests that the construction was often a communal effort.

At Inuksuk Point (Enukso Point) on Baffin Island, there are more than 100 inuksuit. The site was designated a National Historic Site of Canada in 1969.

== Name ==
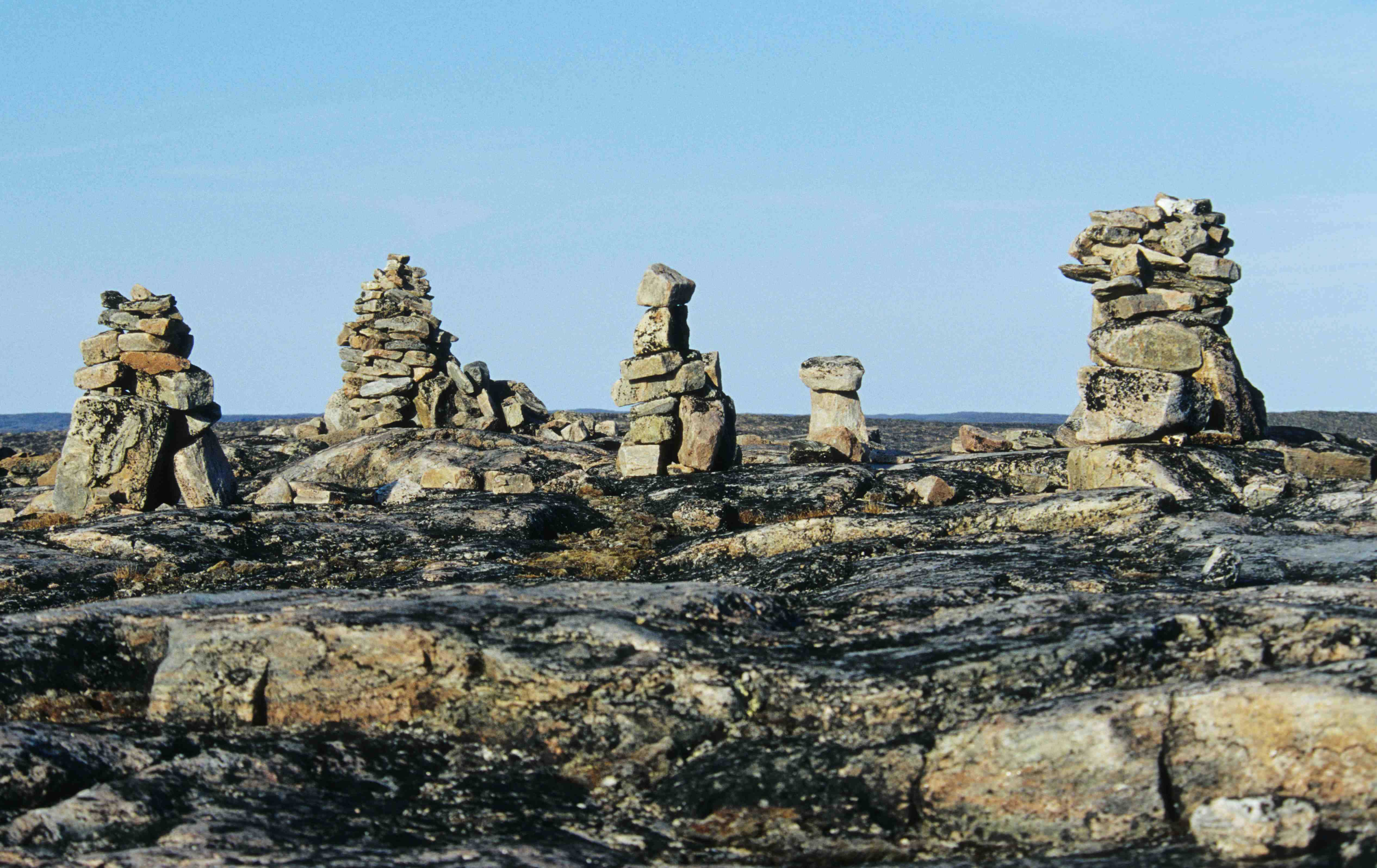
Inuksuit at the Foxe Peninsula (Baffin Island), Canada

The word inuksuk means "that which acts in the capacity of a human". The word comes from the morphemes inuk ('person') and -suk ('ersatz, substitute'). It is pronounced inutsuk in Nunavik and the southern part of Baffin Island (see Inuit phonology for the linguistic reasons). In many of the central Nunavut dialects, it has the etymologically related name inuksugaq (plural: inuksugait).

While the predominant English spelling is inukshuk, both the Government of Nunavut and the Government of Canada through Indigenous and Northern Affairs Canada promote the Inuit-preferred spelling inuksuk.

A structure similar to an inuksuk is called an inunnguaq (ᐃᓄᙳᐊᖅ, 'imitation of a person', plural inunnguat); it is meant to represent a human figure. Inunnguaq has become widely familiar to non-Inuit, and is particularly found in Greenland. However, it is not the most common type of inuksuk. It is distinguished from inuksuit in general.

The Hammer of Thor, located on the Ungava Peninsula, Quebec is most likely an inuksuk rather than of viking origin.

== Modern usage ==
An inuksuk on the flag of Nunavut

Inuksuit continue to serve as an Inuit cultural symbol. An inuksuk is the centrepiece of the flag and coat of arms of the Canadian territory of Nunavut, and the flag of Nunatsiavut. The Inuksuk High School in Iqaluit is named after the landmark.

Inuksuit—particularly, but not exclusively, of the inunnguaq variety—are also increasingly serving as a mainstream Canadian national symbol. In 1999, Inukshuk was the name for the International Arctic Art & Music Project of ARBOS in the Canadian provinces of Quebec, Ontario, Nunavik, and Nunavut; and in Greenland, Austria, Denmark and Norway.

On July 13, 2005, Canadian military personnel erected an inuksuk on Hans Island, along with a plaque and a Canadian flag, as part of the Whiskey War, Canada's then unresolved dispute with Denmark over the small Arctic island. The markers have been erected throughout the country, often as generic gateways into tourist regions, including a 9 m (30 ft) inuksuk that stands in Toronto on the shores of Lake Ontario. Located in Battery Park, it commemorates the World Youth Day 2002 festival that was held in the city in July 2002.

An inunnguaq is the basis of the logo of the 2010 Winter Olympics designed by Vancouver artist Elena Rivera MacGregor. Its use in this context has been controversial among the Inuit, and the First Nations within British Columbia. Although the design has been questioned, people believe it pays tribute to Alvin Kanak's 1986 inuksuk at English Bay. Friendship and the welcoming of the world are the meanings of both the English Bay structure and the 2010 Winter Olympics emblem.

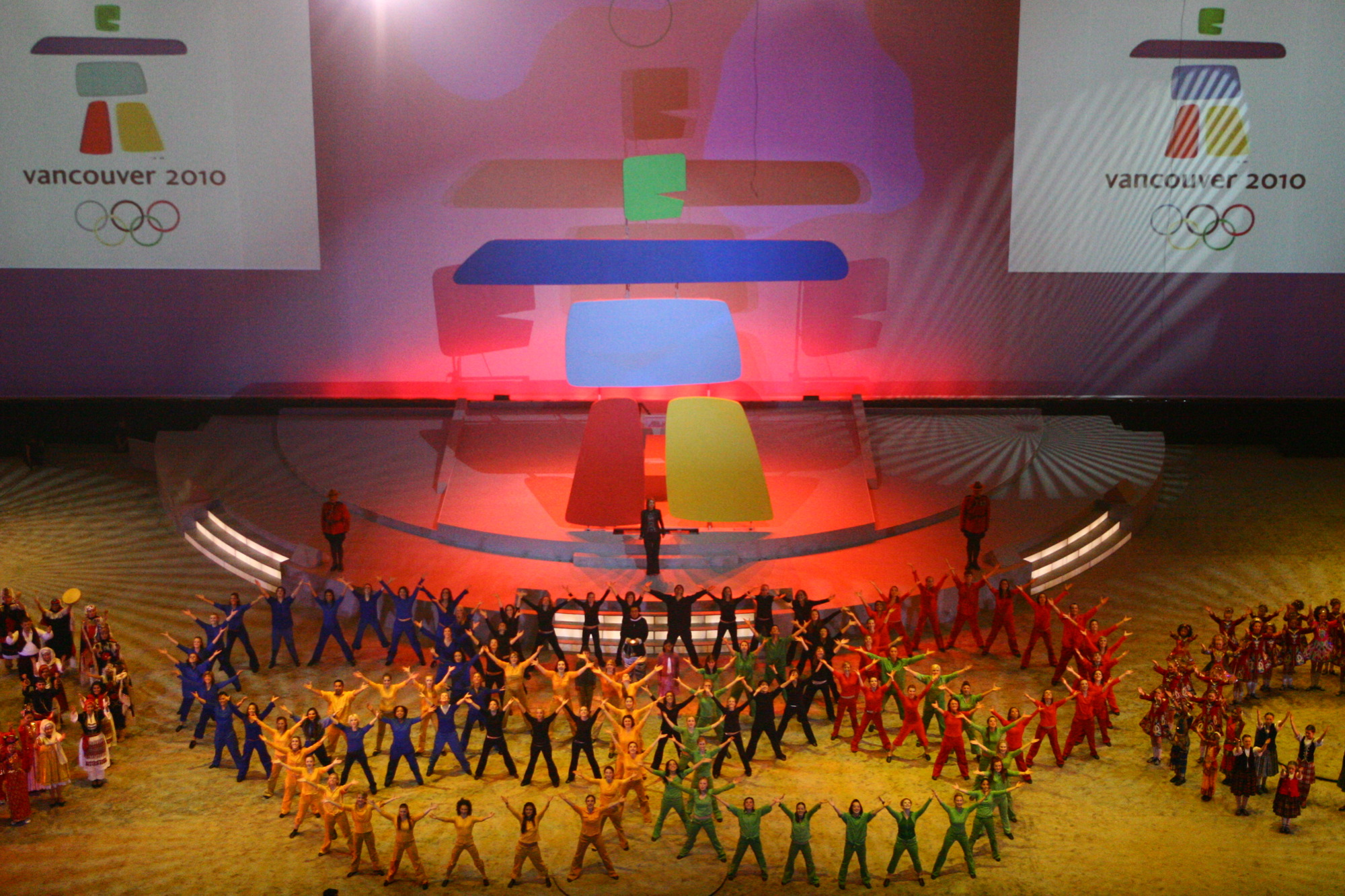
Unveiling ceremony of the 2010 Olympic Winter Games emblem, "Ilanaaq the inukshuk", April 24, 2005

The Vancouver 2010 logo and the construction of inuksuit around the world have led to increasing recognition of them. There are five authentic inuksuit which were donated to other jurisdictions—wholly or in part—by the government of Canada: they are located in Brisbane, Australia; Monterrey, Mexico; Oslo, Norway; Washington, D.C., United States; and Guatemala City, Guatemala.

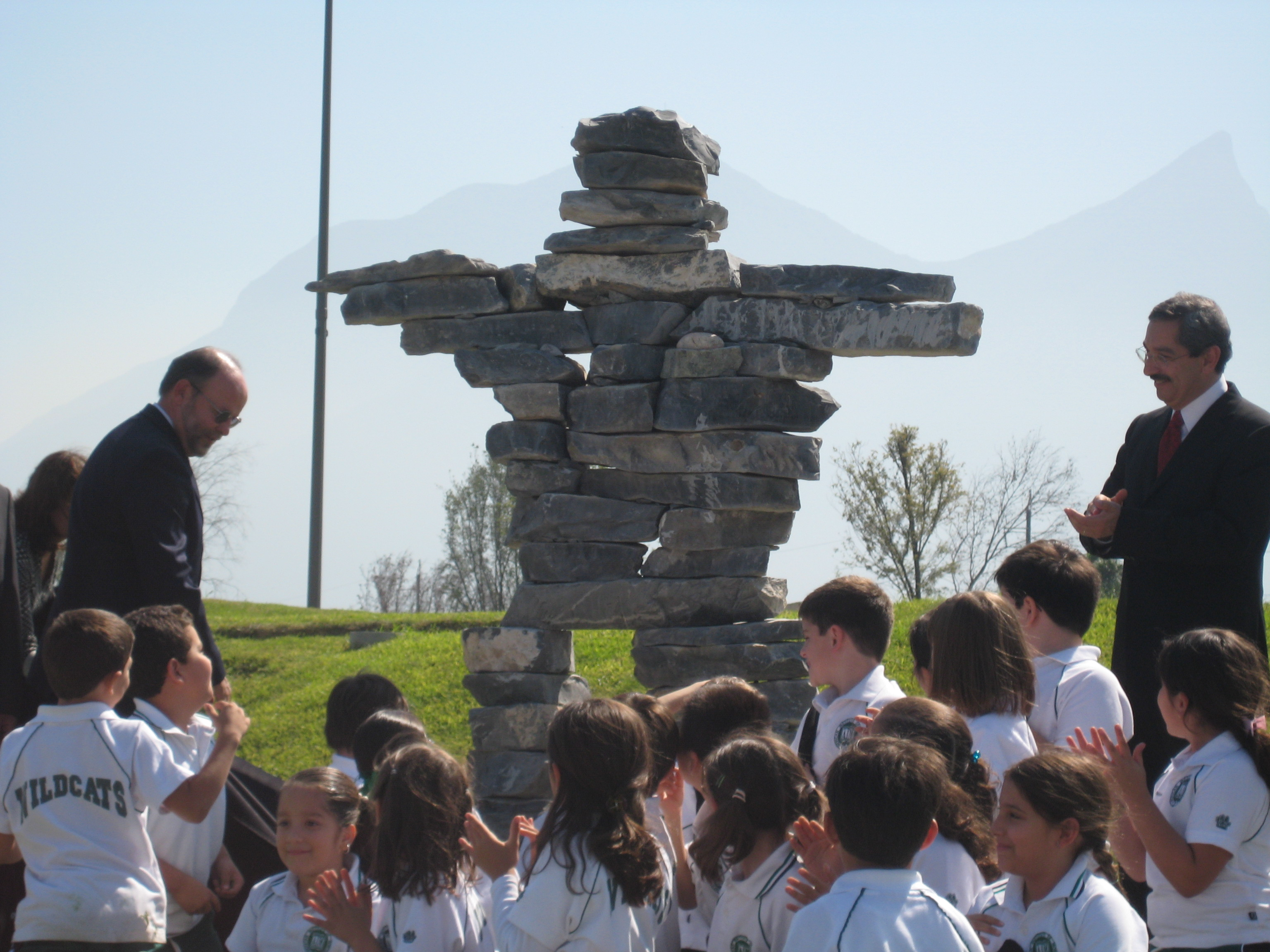
The Monterrey Inuksuk is unveiled by Canada's ambassador to Mexico and the governor of Nuevo León.

A Canadian-donated inuksuk was built in Monterrey, Mexico, in October 2007 by the Inuvialuk artist Bill Nasogaluak. The sculpture was presented to the people of the northern state of Nuevo León as a gift from the Monterrey chapter of the Canadian Chamber of Commerce in Mexico and the Government of Canada, to mark the chamber's 10th anniversary in the city. The sculpture stands over the Santa Lucía Riverwalk. Nasogaluak, of Tuktoyaktuk, personally chose the rocks for the structure from a local quarry near Monterrey. The inuksuk contains two rocks which the artist took to Mexico from Canada, one from the high Arctic and another from his home town of Toronto. Together they form the inuksuk's heart.

The inuksuk was also used as the symbol of the Summit of the Americas, because of its connotations of "guidance and unity ... towards common goals."

Officials in various wilderness parks throughout Canada routinely dismantle inuksuit constructed by hikers and campers, for fear that they could misdirect park visitors from the cairns and other markers that indicate hiking trails. The practice of erecting inuksuit in parks has become so widespread that Killarney Provincial Park, on the north shore of Ontario's Georgian Bay, issued a notice in 2007 urging visitors to "stop the invasion" of inuksuit.

A large number of inuksuit have been built in some areas along the Trans-Canada Highway, including Northern Ontario. In 2010, a journalist from Sudbury's Northern Life counted 93 inuksuit along Highway 69 between Sudbury and Parry Sound. The journalist successfully tracked down a person who had built two inuksuit along the route; he attributed his action to having had a "fill the dreams moment where I needed to stop and do it" while driving home from a family funeral.

In 2015, a small group of women near Hamilton, Ontario, constructed 1,181 inuksuit on the Chedoke Rail Trail to memorialize the issue of Missing and Murdered Indigenous Women, while seeking government action. It was one of many types of activism across the county, and the newly elected government committed to conducting a national inquiry that year.

According to Guinness World Records, the tallest inuksuk is in Schomberg, Ontario, Canada. Built in 2007, it is 11.377 metres (37.33 ft) tall.

On the occasion of the 20th Anniversary of the Rome Statute, to mark Canada's support for the International Criminal Court (ICC) and as a symbol for its commitment to reconciliation with Canada's First Nations, Canadian Minister of Justice and Attorney General Wilson-Raybould on 7 March 2018 donated an inuksuk as a gift to the ICC. It was unveiled by her and ICC President Judge Silvia Fernández de Gurmendi at the ICC premises in The Hague.

== Gallery ==
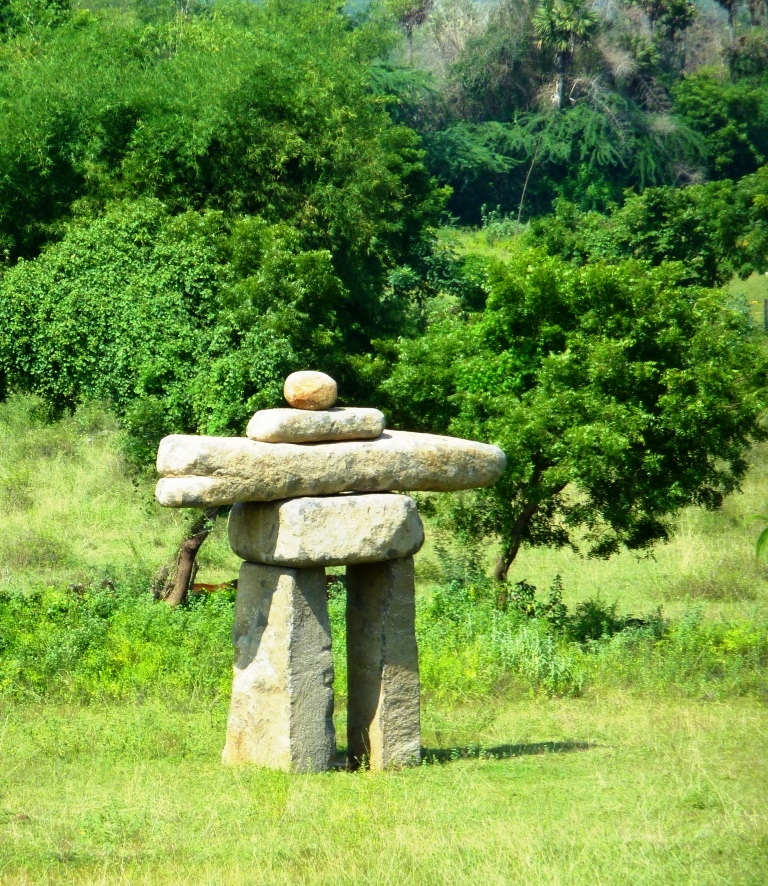
Inuksuk marking Canada's building site at Auroville, Tamil Nadu, India

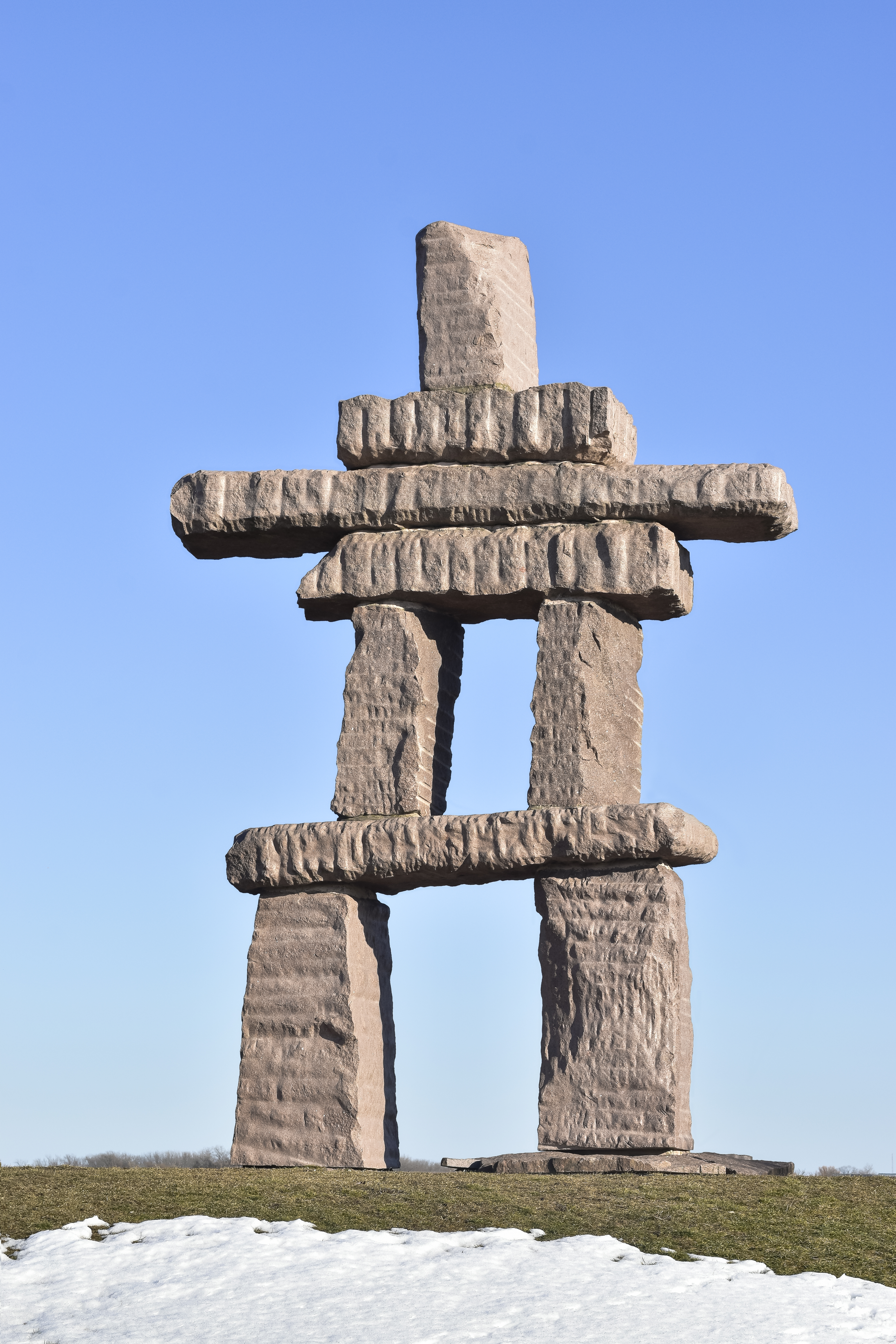
This sculpture is situated in the western part of Toronto near Lake Ontario.

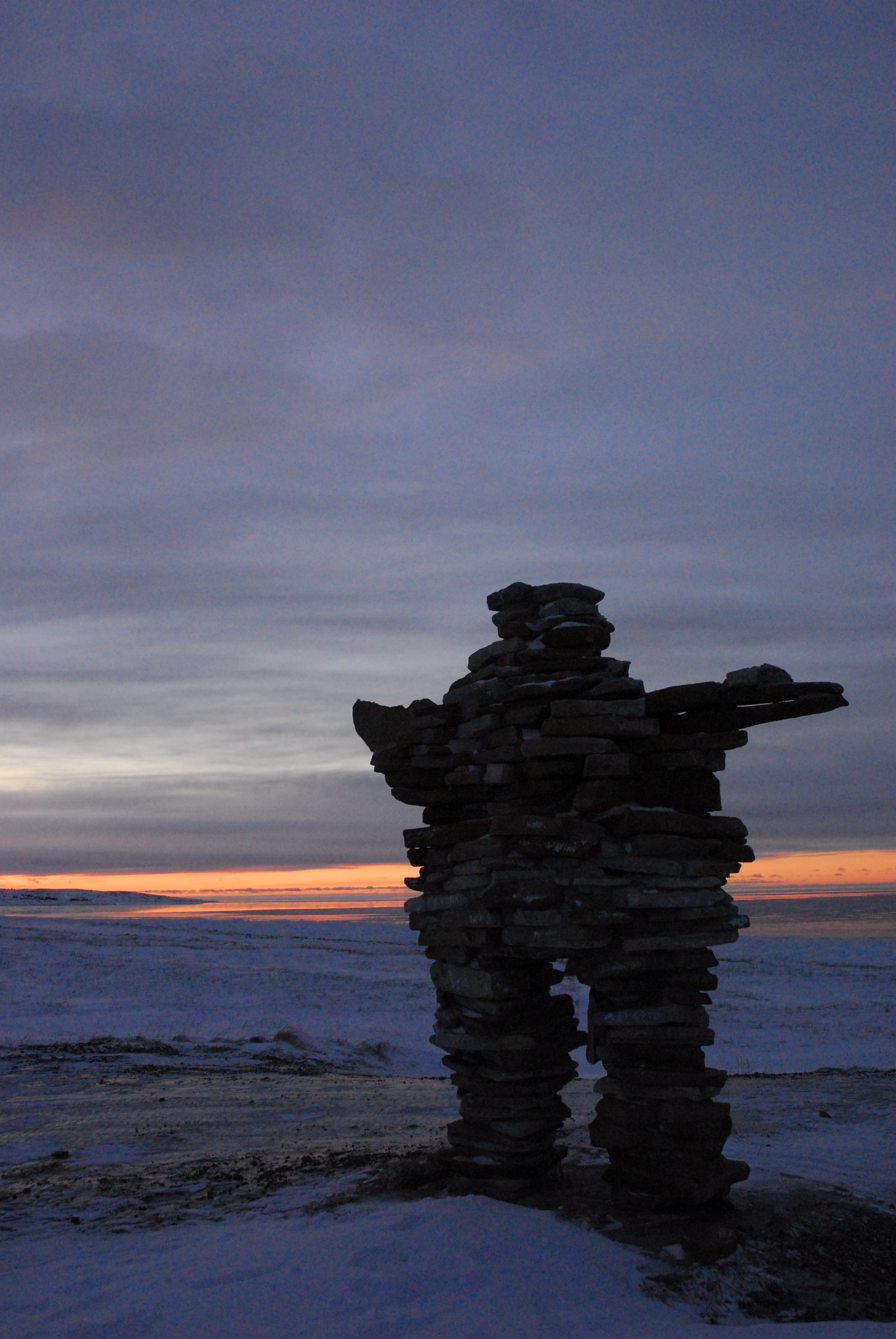
Inuksuk in the vicinity of Kuujjuarapik, Quebec

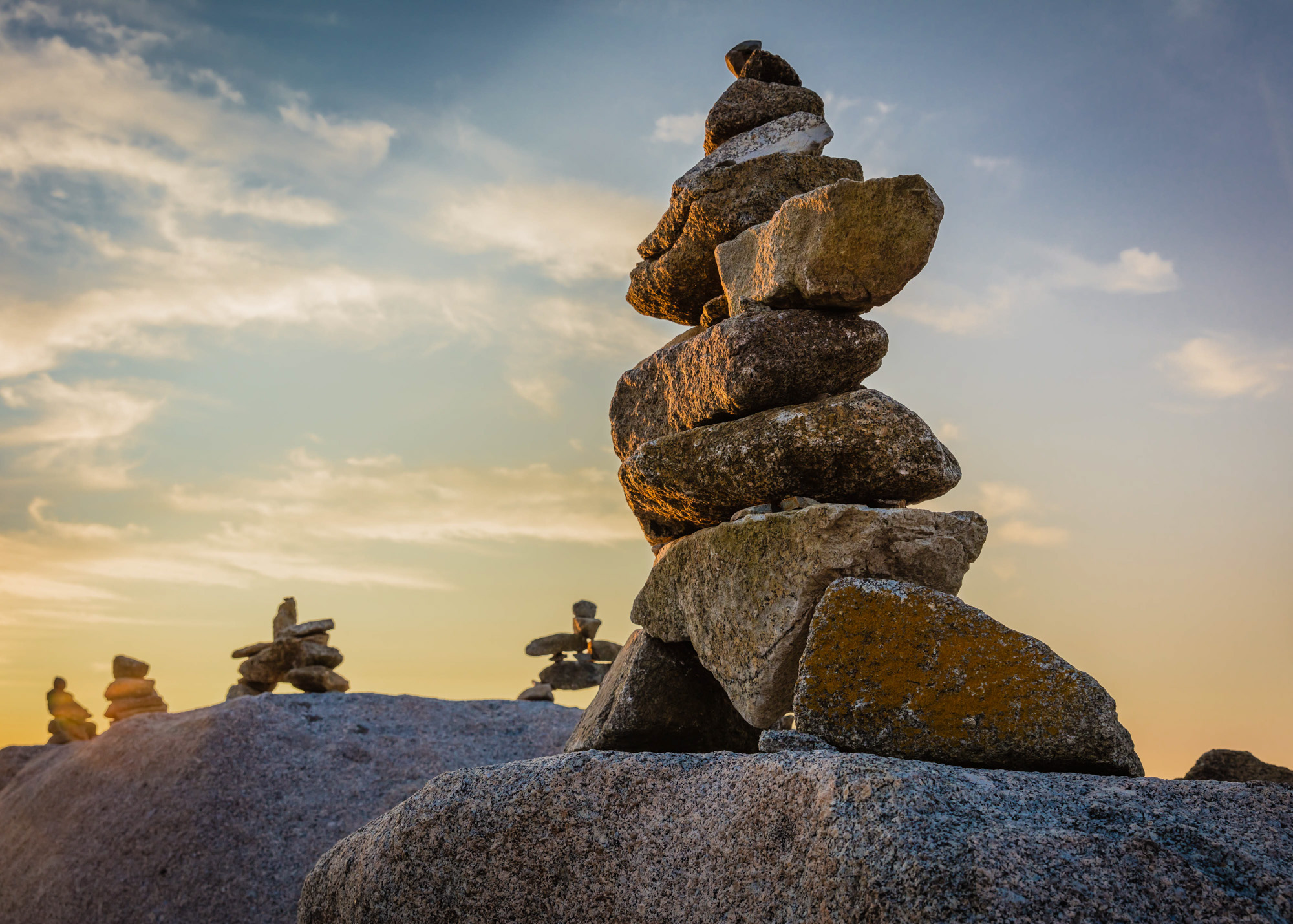
Inuksuk gardens at Peggy's Cove, Nova Scotia, Canada

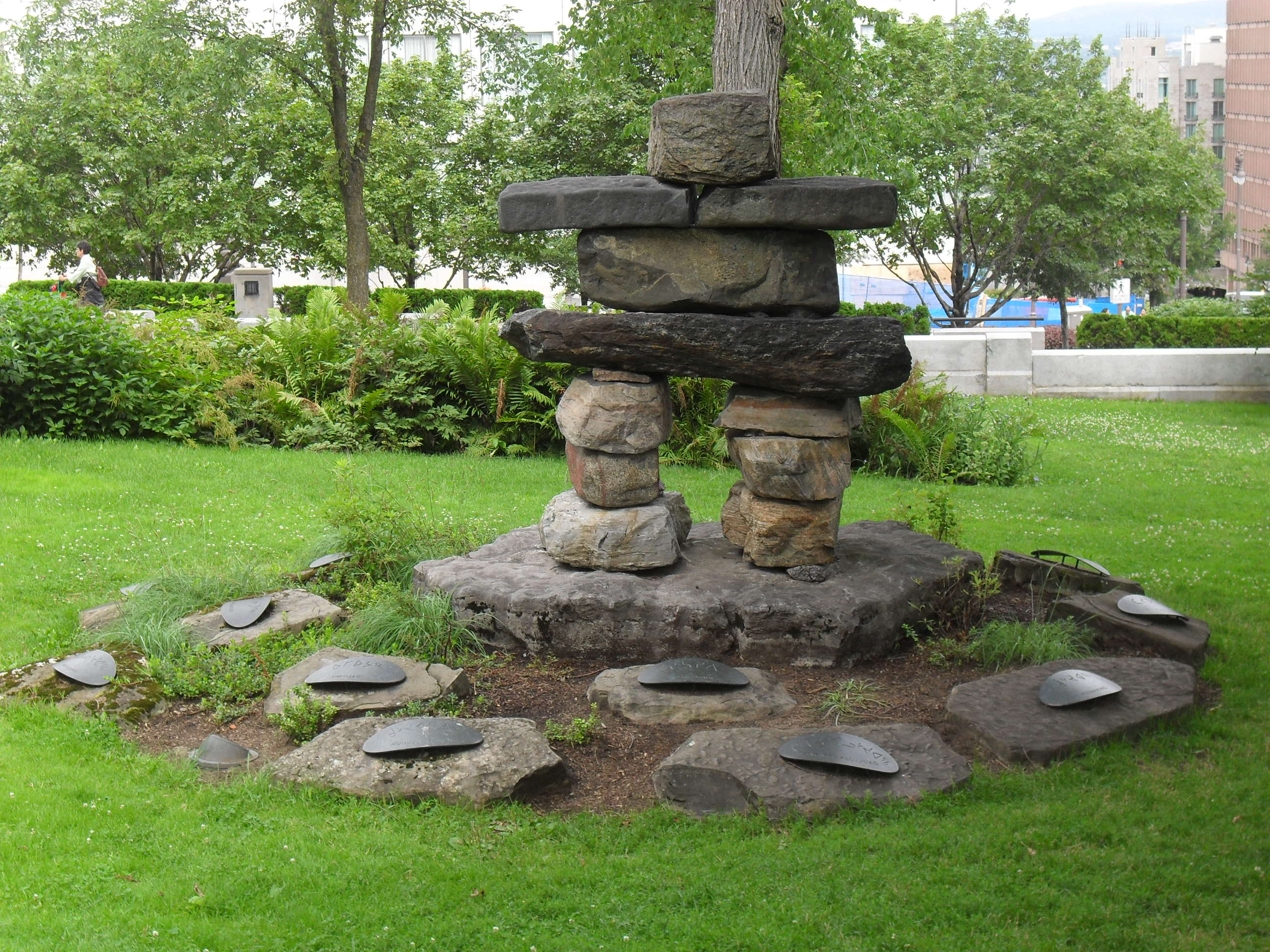
An inuksuk on the grounds of the National Assembly, Quebec City

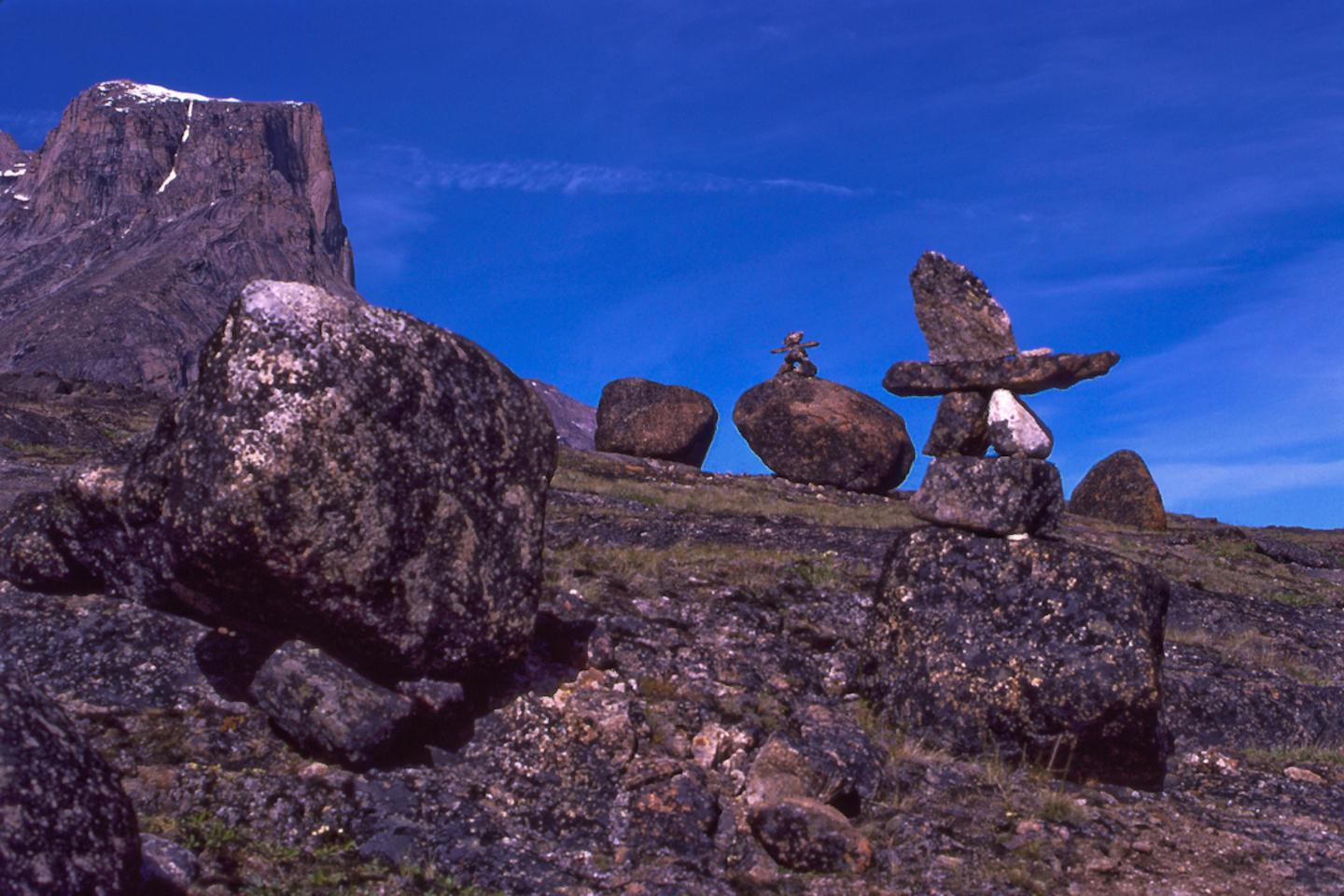
Inuksuit in Auyuittuq National Park, Baffin Island, Nunavut, Canada

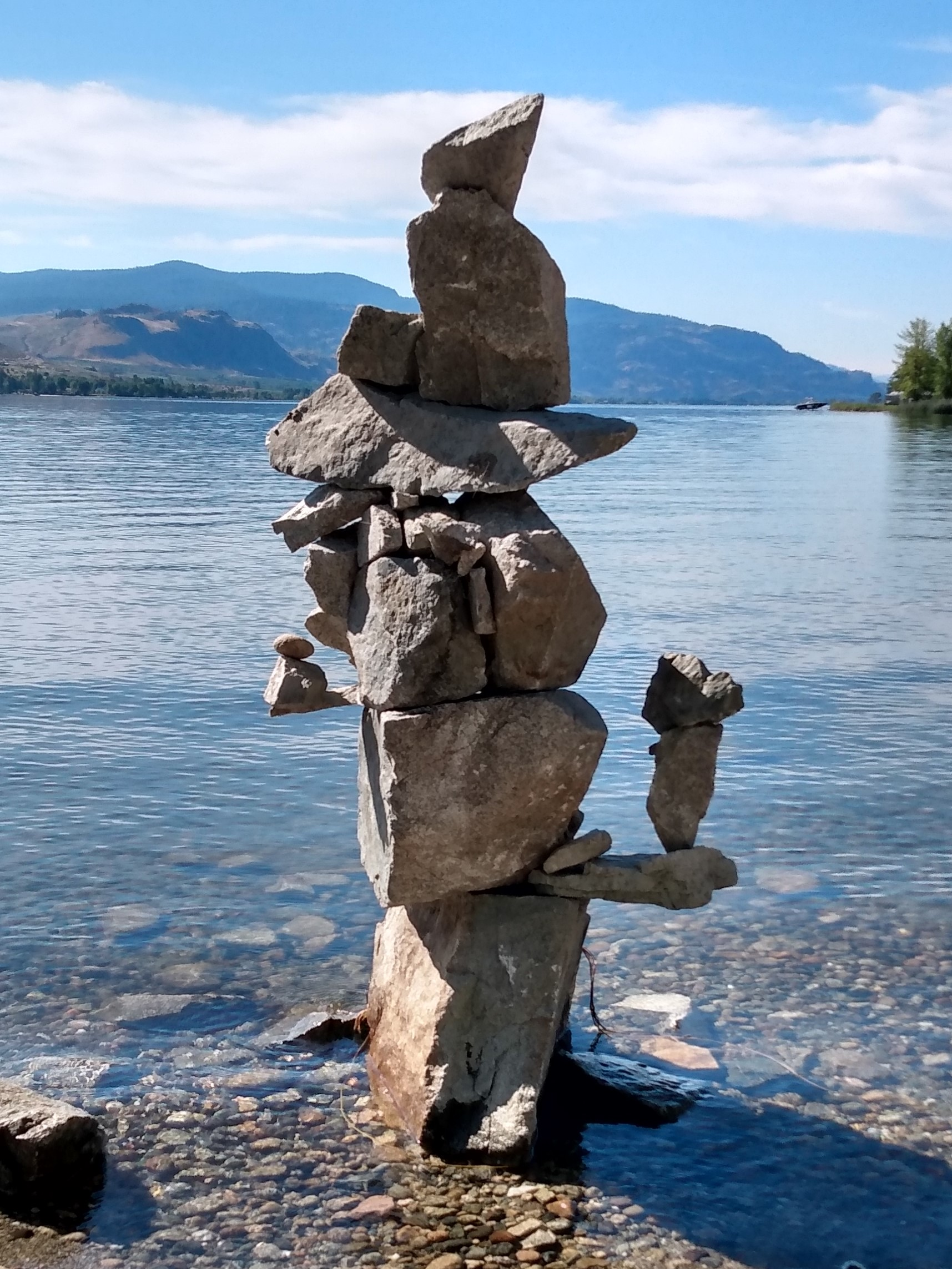
Inuksuk on the shore of sẁiẁs Provincial Park, Osoyoos Lake, British Columbia

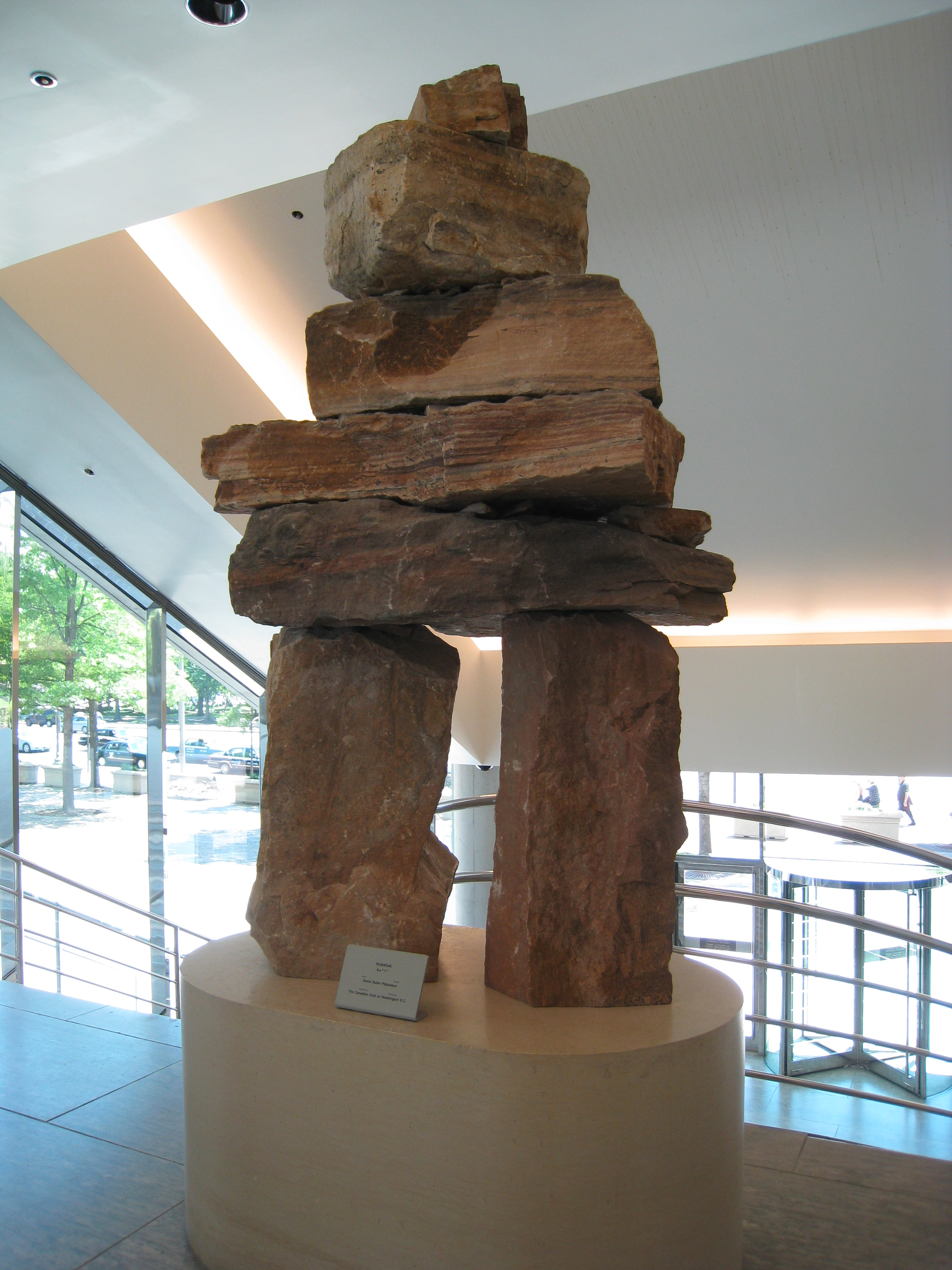
Inuksuk sculpture by David Ruben Piqtoukun in the lobby, Canadian Embassy, Washington, D.C.

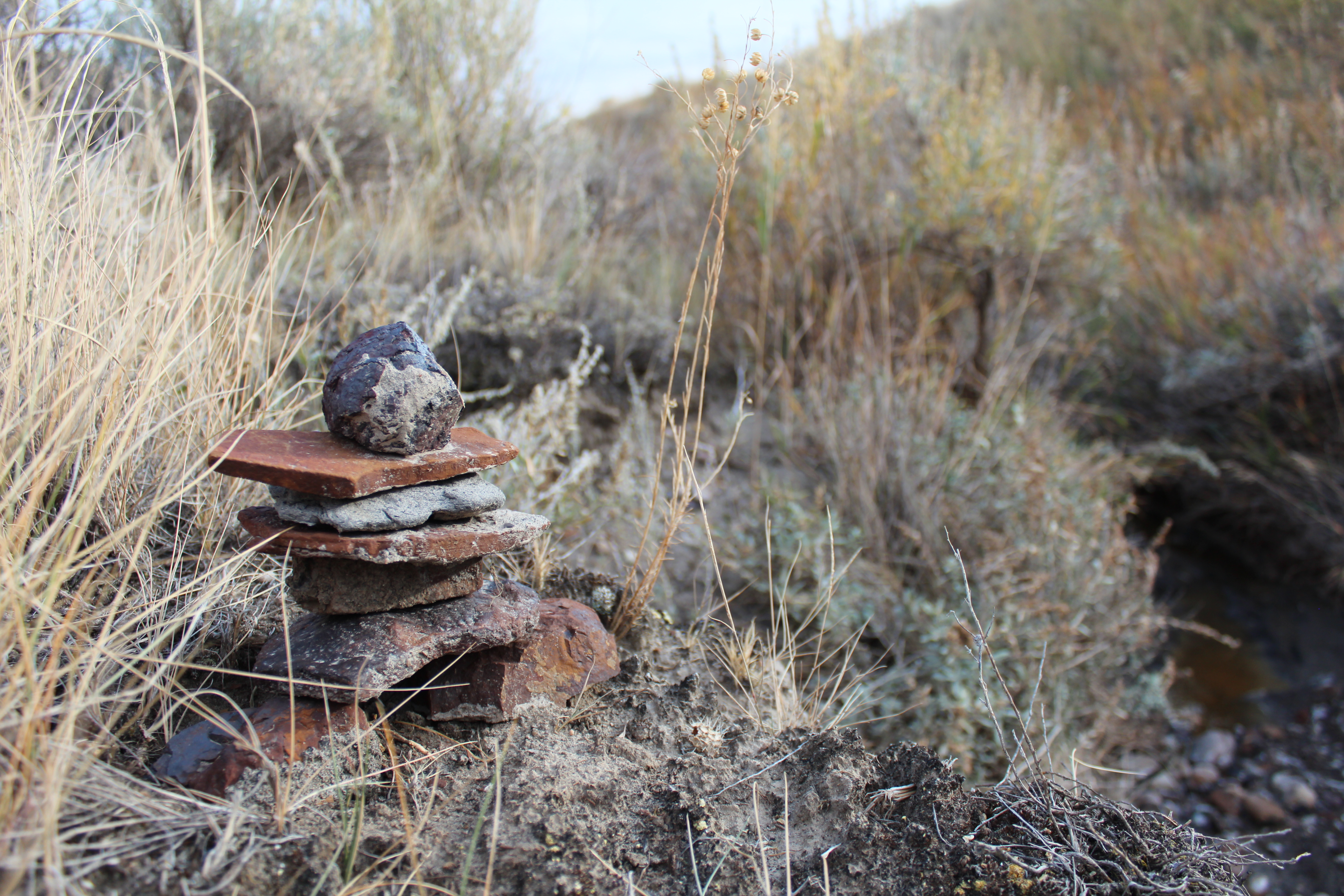
Very small Inuksuk in Drumheller, Alberta

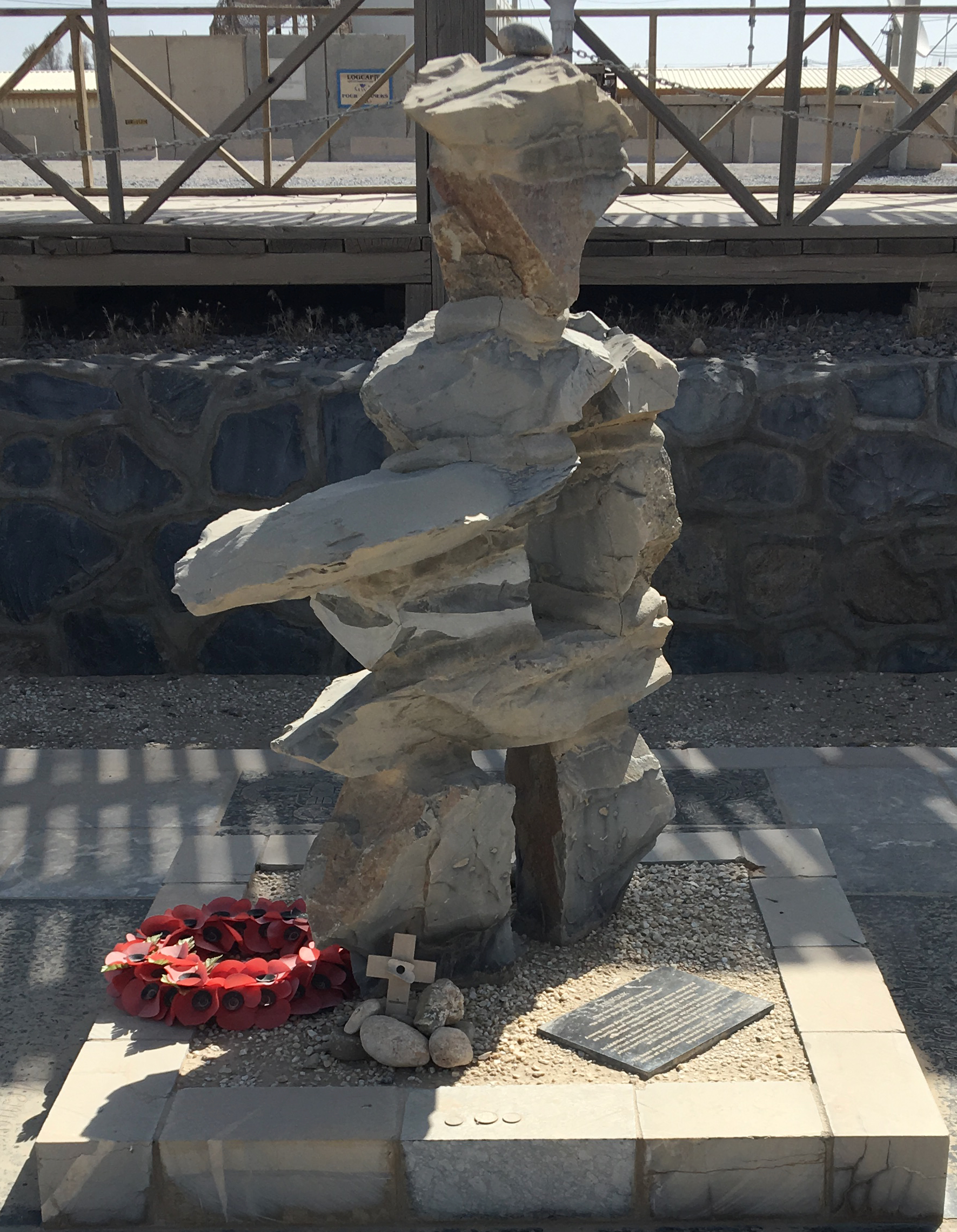
Kandahar Inuksuk, June 2018

== See also ==
- Cairn
- Monolith
- Petroform
- Totem pole
