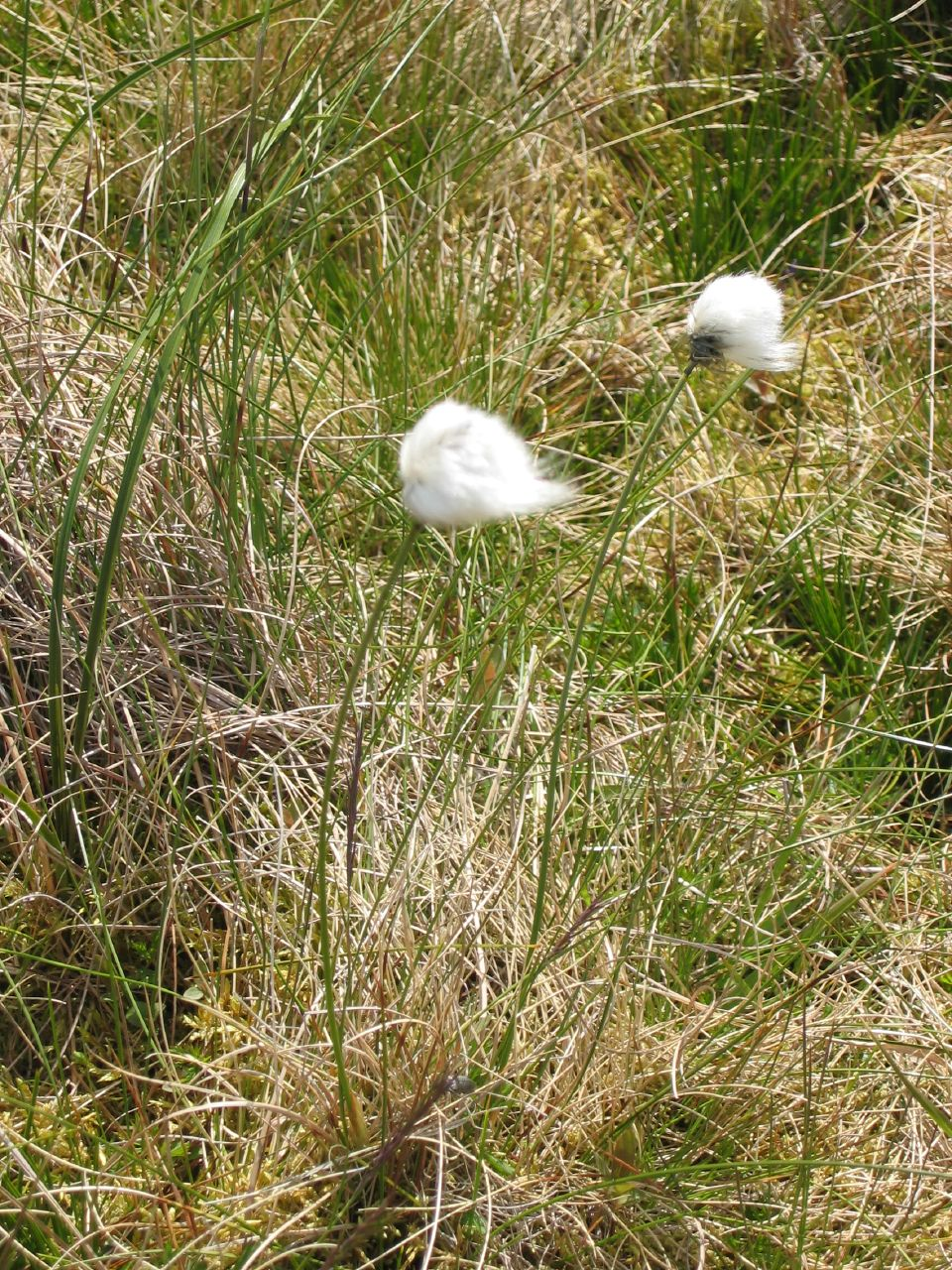
- Northland cottonsedge

Scientific classification
- Kingdom: Plantae
- Clade: Tracheophytes
- Clade: Angiosperms
- Clade: Monocots
- Clade: Commelinids
- Order: Poales
- Family: Cyperaceae
- Genus: Eriophorum
- Species: E. brachyantherum

Binomial name
- Eriophorum brachyantherum Trautv & C.A.Mey.

= Eriophorum brachyantherum =

Species of sedge

Eriophorum brachyantherum, the closed-sheath cotton-grass, short-anthered cotton-grass or northland cottonsedge, is a species that is a part of the Cyperaceae or sedge family. It is commonly found in wet areas, such as bogs and cooler climate zones.

== Description ==
Eriophorum brachyantherum is a perennial monocot with 30–60 cm long stems, 1–2 cm flowers, and 2–4 cm fruit. The root balls are very thick with a fibrous root system. The flower is a single, white, cotton ball-like, feathery flower. In the center of the flower there is an oval shaped fruit that contains short anthers. The fruit is an achene that has scales and is surrounded by perianth bristles. The bristles are extended within the fruit and tend to be silky. This plant grows in grass-like environments and blooms during the summer months of June, July, and August.

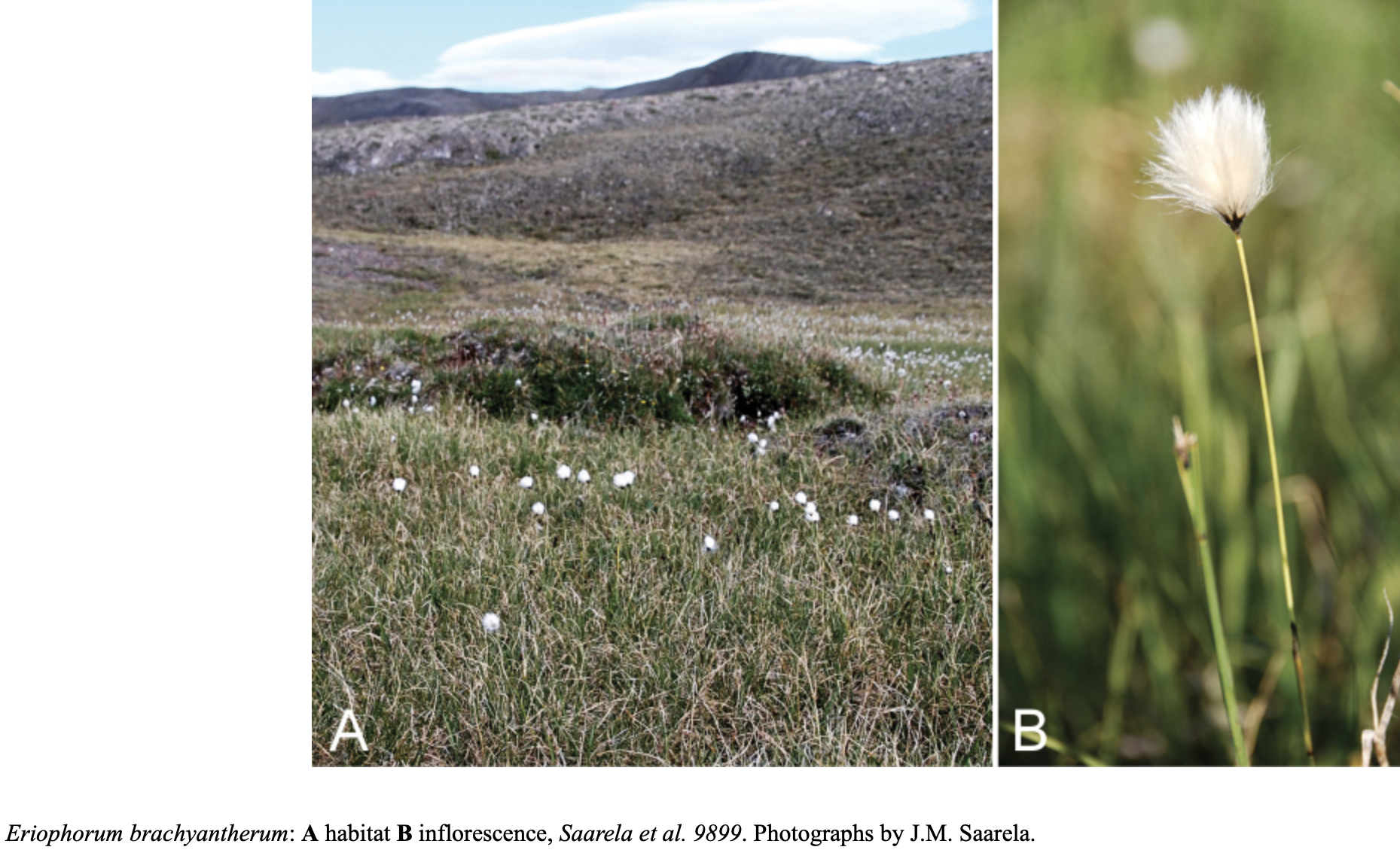

== Distribution ==
The northland cottonsedge has a circumboreal distribution in North America, Europe, and Asia. In the United States it is primarily occurs in Alaska, though it has been recorded from Idaho and Washington as well. In Canada it occurs natively almost country-wide (AB, BC, MB, NL, NT, NU, ON, QC, SK, YT). It prefers to grow in wet areas, and is commonly found in or near bogs, tundra, muskeg, and fens.

== Habitat ==
Eriophorum brachyantherum can be found in water-saturated substrates with high organic matter content. Damp areas with poor drainage such as wet meadows, tundra landscapes, and flood plains are common occupancy areas for populations of this herb. Muskeg swamps are also common environments where this plant is found because of the heavily saturated soil and high organic matter from partially dead vegetation and mosses that occupy the surrounding area. Northland cottonsedge is seldom seen distant from forest edges.

== Reproductive structures ==
Eriophorum brachyantherum flowers in the summertime. The central flowering stems of this plant are significantly taller than the leaves surrounding them. Both sexes are present on each floret of the terminal spike. There are 3 stamens with the anthers splitting longitudinally and 3 ovary carpels that are syncarpous. Each ovary consists of 3 stigmas and 1 ovule. The seed heads consist of white cotton-like fibers and are dispersed by the wind to spread the seeds.

== Uses ==
The stem and root of this plant were previously used as food by Native Americans, albeit very seldom. The Native Americans would boil the root or simply eat it raw, and for the stem they would store it or fry it in seal oil. The Yupik people used an extract from the leaves as a medical treatment for a variety of gastrointestinal problems.
