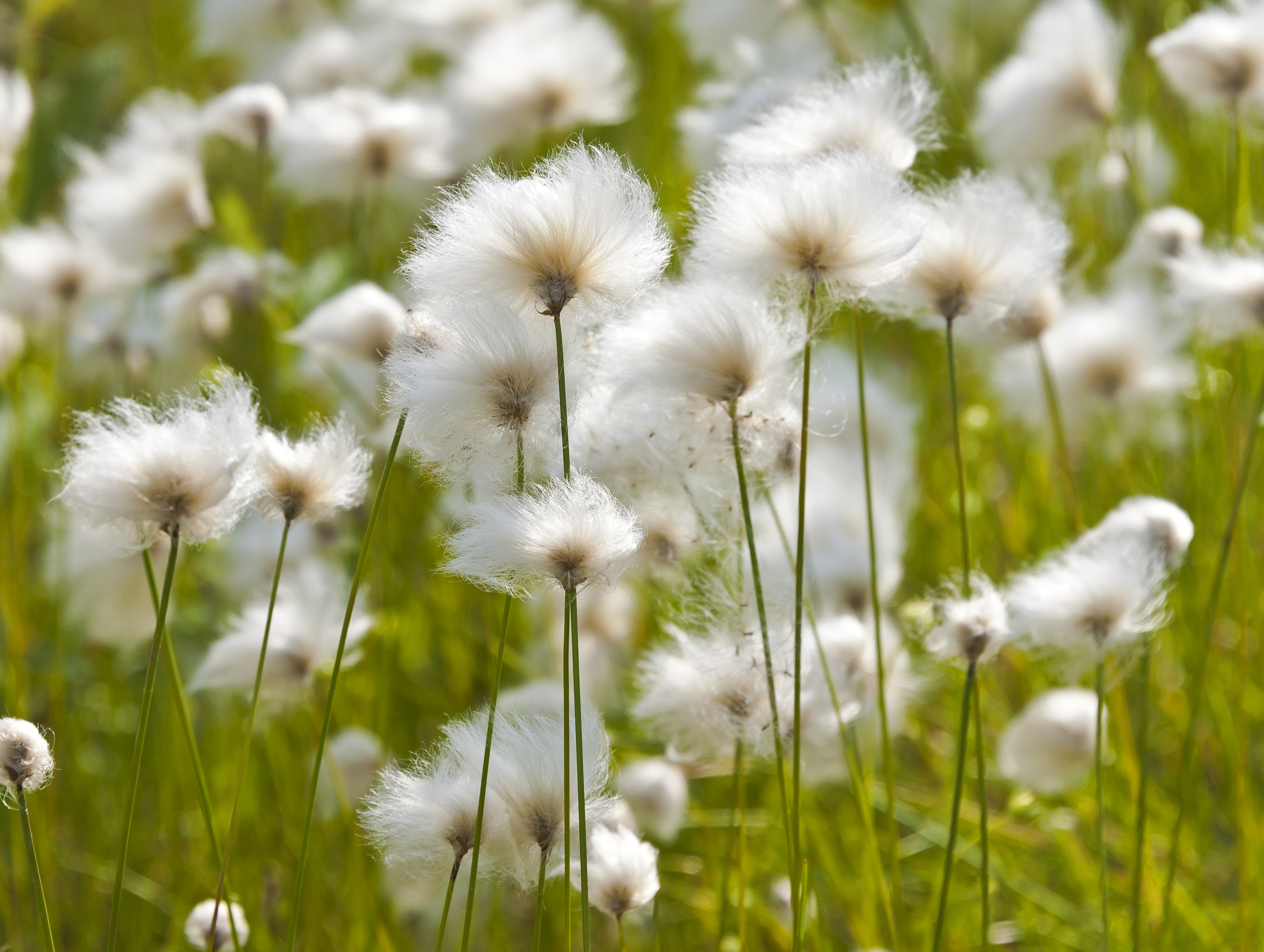
- Arctic cottongrass growing near Inuvik, Canada

Conservation status
- Secure (NatureServe)

Scientific classification
- Kingdom: Plantae
- Clade: Embryophytes
- Clade: Tracheophytes
- Clade: Angiosperms
- Clade: Monocots
- Clade: Commelinids
- Order: Poales
- Family: Cyperaceae
- Genus: Eriophorum
- Species: E. callitrix

Binomial name
- Eriophorum callitrix Cham. ex C.A.Mey.

= Eriophorum callitrix =

Arctic cottongrass

Species of flowering plant in the sedge family

Eriophorum callitrix, commonly known as Arctic cotton, Arctic cottongrass, suputi, or pualunnguat in Inuktitut, is a perennial Arctic plant in the sedge family, Cyperaceae. It is one of the most widespread flowering plants in the northern hemisphere and tundra regions. Upon every stem grows a single round, white and wooly fruit. The seeds are covered in this cottony mass and usually disperse when the wind carries them away.

== Description ==
Eriophorum callitrix has narrow, grass-like leaves.

== Taxonomy ==
Eriophorum callitrix was described and illustrated by the Russian botanist Carl Anton von Meyer in 1831. In his description, Meyer attributed the name itself to the German botanist Adelbert von Chamisso. The illustration shows a plant with a single spikelet (unispicate) and numerous basal leaves. As of September 2025, Eriophorum callitrix Cham. ex C.A.Mey. is a widely accepted name.

== Distribution and habitat ==
Eriophorum callitrix has a northern circumpolar distribution with a gap in northern Europe. Its preferred habitats include wet meadows, tundra, and calcareous bogs.

== Ecology ==
Eriophorum callitrix is food for migrating snow geese, caribou and their calves.

== Uses ==
The Inuit used the seed heads as wicks in seal oil lamps. Clumps were placed into babies' pants and then thrown away when soiled.

== Bibliography ==
- Fernald, M. L. (December 1925). "The Identity of Eriophorum callitrix". Rhodora. 27 (324): 203–210.
- Meyer, Carl Anton von (1831). "Cyperaceae novae descriptionibus et iconibus illustratae". Mém. Acad. Imp. Sci. St.-Pétersbourg Divers Savans. 1: 195–230.
