= Andrew Qappik =

Canadian Inuk graphic artist (born 1964)

- Born: February 25, 1964 (age 62); Nunataq, Northwest Territories, Canada
- Known for: Printmaking

Andrew Qappik CM (born February 25, 1964, in Nunataq, Northwest Territories, now Nunavut) is a Canadian Inuk graphic artist currently residing in Pangnirtung, Nunavut. Qappik is known for his printmaking and his contribution to the Nunavut coat of arms. His uncles Solomon and Imoona Karpik were also artists, and encouraged him to start drawing.

Qappik's prints depicts both animals and traditional Inuit culture, which he has learned about from his own experience and stories by his grandfathers and other relatives. Some of these relatives have been an influence on Qappik's artistic sensibilities. He has a fondness for realistic/naturalistic scenes of Arctic life; an instinctive grasp of line, form and composition, and a use of lighter coloured tones with little negative space.

Qappik's works are published by the Pangnirtung Print Shop, under the auspices of the Uqqurmiut Centre for Arts & Crafts. His work has been exhibited at many museums, including the British Museum, the National Gallery of Canada, the Winnipeg Art Gallery, the Canadian Museum of History, and the Dennos Museum Center.

He was made a Member of the Order of Canada in 2017, for his contribution to the design of coat of arms of Nunavut and the creation of Government of Nunavut and Nunavut Tunngavik Incorporated logos.

== Bibliography ==
- Thomson, Jane Sproull and Luke Ratzlaff "Andrew Qappik's Contemporary Arctic Visions", Inuit Art Quarterly 20 (2005): 10-16.
