= List of Minnesota wildflowers =

This is a list of all the wildflowers native to Minnesota by common name, following Minnesota DNR conventions. Where several species of plants share part of a common name, they have been grouped together under that name; this is for indexing purposes and does not always indicate a taxonomic relationship.

== A ==
- Alexanders
  - Golden alexanders (Zizia aurea)
  - Heart-leaved alexanders (Zizia aptera)
- Anemone
  - Canada anemone (Anemone canadensis)
  - Cut-leaved anemone (Anemone multifida var. multifida)
  - Wood anemone (Anemone quinquefolia)
- Aplectrum
  - Adam and Eve (Aplectrum hyemale)
- Asters
  - Aromatic aster (Symphyotrichum oblongifolium)
  - Awl aster (Symphyotrichum pilosum)
  - Bog aster (Symphyotrichum boreale)
  - Crooked aster (Symphyotrichum prenanthoides)
  - Drummond's aster (Symphyotrichum drummondii)
  - Eastern panicled aster (Symphyotrichum lanceolatum ssp. lanceolatum)
  - Flat-topped aster (Doellingeria umbellata)
  - Heath aster (Symphyotrichum ericoides)
  - Heart-leaved aster (Symphyotrichum cordifolium)
  - Large-leaved aster (Eurybia macrophylla)
  - Lindley's aster (Symphyotrichum ciliolatum)
  - Long aster (Symphyotrichum x longulum)
  - Modest aster (Canadanthus modestus)
  - New England aster (Symphyotrichum novae-angliae)
  - New England aster and Heath aster hybrid (Symphyotrichum x amethystinum)
  - Ontario aster (Symphyotrichum ontarionis)
  - Red-stemmed aster (Symphyotrichum puniceum)
  - Short's aster (Symphyotrichum shortii; threatened)
  - Sickle-shaped aster (Symphyotrichum falcatum)
  - Side-flowering aster (Symphyotrichum lateriflorum)
  - Silky aster (Symphyotrichum sericeum)
  - Skyblue aster (Symphyotrichum oolentangiense)
  - Smooth aster (Symphyotrichum laeve)
  - Veiny lined aster (Symphyotrichum praealtum)
  - Western panicled aster (Symphyotrichum lanceolatum ssp. hesperium)
- Autumn sneezeweed (Helenium autumnale)

== B ==
- Baneberries
  - Red baneberry (Actaea rubra)
  - White baneberry (Actaea pachypoda)
- Beard-tongues
  - Large-flowered beard tongue (Penstemon grandiflorus)
  - Pale beard tongue (Penstemon pallidus)
  - Slender beard tongue (Penstemon gracilis)
  - White beard tongue (Penstemon albidus)
- Bellworts
  - Large-flowered bellwort (Uvularia grandiflora)
  - Pale bellwort (Uvularia sessilifolia)
- Black-eyed Susan (Rudbeckia hirta)
- Blanketflower (Gaillardia aristata)
- Blazing stars
  - Cylindric blazing star (Liatris cylindracea)
  - Dotted blazing star (Liatris punctata)
  - Great blazing star (Liatris pycnostachya)
  - Northern plains blazing star (Liatris ligulistylis)
  - Rough blazing star (Liatris aspera)
- Bloodroot (Sanguinaria canadensis)
- Bluebead lily (Clintonia borealis)
- Blueberries
  - Lowbush blueberry (Vaccinium angustifolium)
  - Velvet-leaved blueberry (Vaccinium myrtilloides)
- Blue-eyed grasses
  - Field blue-eyed grass (Sisyrinchium campestre)
  - Mountain blue-eyed grass (Sisyrinchium montanum montanum)
  - Narrowleaf blue-eyed grass (Sisyrinchium angustifolium)
  - Pointed-petal blue-eyed grass (Sisyrinchium mucronatum)
- Blue flags
  - Northern blue flag (Iris versicolor)
  - Southern blue flag (Iris virginica var. shrevei)
- Bunchberry (Cornus canadensis)
- Butterflyweed (Asclepias tuberosa var. interior)

== C ==
- Canada mayflower (Maianthemum canadense)
- Cinquefoils
  - Bushy cinquefoil (Potentilla paradoxa)
  - Marsh cinquefoil (Potentilla palustris)
  - Pennsylvania cinquefoil (Potentilla pensylvanica)
  - Rough cinquefoil (Potentilla norvegica)
  - Shrubby cinquefoil (Potentilla fruticosa)
  - Slender cinquefoil (Potentilla flabelliformis)
  - Spreading cinquefoil (Potentilla effusa)
  - Tall cinquefoil (Potentilla arguta)
- Wild Columbine (Aquilegia canadensis)
- Coneflowers
  - Gray-headed coneflower (Ratibida pinnata)
  - Narrow-leaved purple coneflower (Echinacea pallida var. angustifolia)
  - Prairie coneflower (Ratibida columnifera)
  - Sweet coneflower (Rudbeckia subtomentosa)
  - Tall coneflower (Rudbeckia laciniata var. laciniata)
  - Three-leaved coneflower (Rudbeckia triloba var. triloba; special concern)
- Coralroot
  - Autumn coralroot (Corallorhiza odontorhiza var. odontorhiza)
  - Early coralroot (Corallorhiza trifida)
  - Spotted coralroot (Corallorhiza maculata)
  - Striped coralroot (Corallorhiza striata var. striata)
- Cottongrasses
  - Chamisso's cottongrass (Eriophorum chamissonis)
  - Delicate cottongrass (Eriophorum tenellum)
  - Green-keeled cottongrass (Eriophorum viridicarinatum)
  - Slender cottongrass (Eriophorum gracile)
  - Tall cottongrass (Eriophorum polystachion)
  - Tawny cottongrass (Eriophorum virginicum)
  - Tussock cottongrass (Eriophorum vaginatum var. spissum)
- Cow parsnip (Heracleum maximum)
- Culver's root (Veronicastrum virginicum)

== D ==
- Dogbanes
  - Clasping dogbane (Apocynum sibiricum)
  - Hemp dogbane or American hemp, (Apocynum cannabinum)
  - Intermediate dogbane (Apocynum x floribundum)
  - Spreading dogbane (Apocynum androsaemifolium)

== E ==
- Evening primroses
  - Common evening primrose (Oenothera biennis)
  - Cleland's evening primrose (Oenothera clelandii)
  - Cut-leaved evening primrose (Oenothera laciniata)
  - Northern evening primrose (Oenothera parviflora)
  - Nuttall's evening primrose (Oenothera nuttallii)
  - Perennial evening primrose (Oenothera perennis)
  - Rhombic evening primrose (Oenothera rhombipetala)
  - Toothed evening primrose (Calylophus serrulatus)

== F ==
- False Solomon's Seals
  - Common false Solomon's seal (Smilacina racemosa)
  - Starry false Solomon's seal (Smilacina stellata)
  - Three-leaved false Solomon's seal (Smilacina trifolia)
- Fireweed (Epilobium angustifolium)
- Flodman's thistle (Cirsium flodmanii)

== G ==
- Gaywings (Polygala paucifolia)
- Gentians
  - Billington's gentian (Gentiana x billingtonii)
  - Bottle gentian (Gentiana andrewsii)
  - Downy gentian (Gentiana puberulenta)
  - Great Lakes gentian (Gentiana rubricaulis)
  - Greater fringed gentian (Gentianopsis crinita)
  - Horse gentian (Triosteum aurantiacum)
  - Lesser fringed gentian (Gentianopsis procera)
  - Northern gentian (Gentiana affinis; special concern)
  - Spurred gentian (Halenia deflexa)
  - Stiff gentian (Gentianella quinquefolia var. occidentalis)
  - Yellowish gentian (Gentiana flavida)
- Giant hyssops
  - Blue giant hyssop (Agastache foeniculum)
  - Purple giant hyssop (Agastache scrophulariaefolia)
  - Yellow giant hyssop (Agastache nepetoides)
- Goldenrod
  - Canada goldenrod (Solidago canadensis)
  - Early goldenrod (Solidago juncea)
  - Giant goldenrod (Solidago gigantea)
  - Gray goldenrod (Solidago nemoralis)
  - Hairy goldenrod (Solidago hispida)
  - Missouri goldenrod (Solidago missouriensis)
  - Riddell's goldenrod (Solidago riddellii)
  - Stiff goldenrod (Solidago rigida)
  - Soft goldenrod (Solidago mollis; special concern)
  - Upland white aster (Solidago ptarmicoides)
  - Zigzag goldenrod (Solidago flexicaulis)
- Ground plum (Astragalus crassicarpus)
- Gumweed (Grindelia squarrosa)

== H ==
- Harebell (Campanula rotundifolia)
- Hepaticas
  - Sharp-lobed hepatica (Anemone acutiloba)
  - Round-lobed hepatica (Anemone americana)
- Honeysuckles
  - Bush honeysuckle (Diervilla lonicera)
  - Fly honeysuckle (Lonicera canadensis)
  - Grape honeysuckle (Lonicera reticulata)
  - Hairy honeysuckle (Lonicera hirsuta)
  - Mountain fly honeysuckle (Lonicera villosa)
  - Swamp fly honeysuckle (Lonicera oblongifolia)
  - Wild honeysuckle (Lonicera dioica)

== I ==
- Indian paintbrushes
  - Downy paintbrush (Castilleja sessiliflora)
  - Indian paintbrush (Castilleja coccinea)
  - Northern paintbrush (Castilleja septentrionalis; endangered)
- Indian pipe (Monotropa uniflora)

== J ==
- Jack-in-the-pulpit (Arisaema triphyllum)
- Joe pye weeds
  - Spotted Joe pye weed (Eupatorium maculatum)
  - Sweet Joe pye weed (Eupatorium purpureum)

== L ==
- Lady's slippers
  - Andrew's lady's slipper (Cypripedium × andrewsii)
  - Showy lady's slipper (Cypripedium reginae; the Minnesota State flower)
  - Small white lady's slipper (Cypripedium candidum; special concern)
  - Stemless lady's slipper, also known as Moccasin flower, (Cypripedium acaule)
  - Yellow lady's slipper (Cypripedium calceolus)
- Leadplant (Amorpha canescens)

== M ==
- Marsh marigolds
  - Floating marsh marigold (Caltha natans; endangered)
  - Common marsh marigold (Caltha palustris)
- Milk vetches
  - Alpine milk vetch (Astragalus alpinus; endangered)
  - Canada milk vetch (Astragalus canadensis)
  - Cooper's milk vetch (Astragalus neglectus)
  - Field milk vetch (Astragalus agrestis)
  - Loose-flowered milkvetch (Astragalus tenellus)
  - Lotus milk vetch (Astragalus lotiflorus)
  - Missouri milk vetch (Astragalus missouriensis; special concern)
  - Prairie milk vetch (Astragalus adsurgens)
  - Racemose milk vetch (Astragalus racemosus; possibly non-native)
  - Slender milk vetch (Astragalus flexuosus; special concern)
- Milkweeds
  - Clasping milkweed (Asclepias amplexicaulis; special concern)
  - Common milkweed (Asclepias syriaca)
  - Green milkweed (Asclepias viridiflora)
  - Narrow-leaved milkweed (Asclepias stenophylla; endangered)
  - Oval-leaved milkweed (Asclepias ovalifolia)
  - Poke milkweed (Asclepias exaltata)
  - Prairie milkweed (Asclepias hirtella; threatened)
  - Purple milkweed (Asclepias purpurascens)
  - Showy milkweed (Asclepias speciosa)
  - Sullivant's milkweed (Asclepias sullivantii; threatened)
  - Swamp milkweed (Asclepias incarnata var. incarnata)
  - Whorled milkweed (Asclepias verticillata)
  - Woolly milkweed (Asclepias lanuginosa)
- Miterworts
  - Naked miterwort (Mitella nuda)
  - Two-leaved miterwort (Mitella diphylla)

== O ==
- Orchids
  - Hooker's orchid (Platanthera hookeri)
  - Intermediate bog orchid (Platanthera × media)
  - Large round-leaved orchid (Platanthera orbiculata)
  - Long-bracted orchid (Ceologlossum viride var. varescens)
  - Ragged fringed orchid (Platanthera lacera)
  - Ram's head orchid (Cypripedium arietinum; threatened)
  - Small green wood orchid (Platanthera clavellata; special concern)
  - Small northern bog orchid (Platanthera obtusata)
  - Small purple fringed orchid (Platanthera psycodes)
  - Tall northern bog orchid (Platanthera hyperborea)
  - Tall white bog orchid (Platanthera dilatata)
  - Tubercled rein orchid (Platanthera flava var. herbiola; endangered)
  - Western prairie fringed orchid (Platanthera praeclara; threatened)
- Ox-eye or early sunflower (Heliopsis helianthoides var. scabra)

== P ==
- Prairie clover
  - Foxtail prairie clover (Dalea leporina)
  - Purple prairie clover (Dalea purpurea)
  - Silky prairie clover (Dalea villosa)
  - White prairie clover (Dalea candida)

== R ==
- Roses
  - Prairie rose (Rosa arkansana)
  - Prickly rose (Rosa acicularis)
  - Smooth wild rose (Rosa blanda)
  - Wood's rose (Rosa woodsii var. woodsii)

== S ==
- Silverleaf scurfpea (Pediomelum argophyllum)
- Spiderworts
  - Bracted spiderwort (Tradescantia bracteata)
  - Ohio spiderwort (Tradescantia ohiensis)
  - Western spiderwort (Tradescantia occidentalis)
- Starflower (Trientalis borealis)
- Strawberries
  - Common strawberry (Fragaria virginiana)
  - Wood strawberry (Fragaria vesca var. americana)
- Sunflowers
  - Bright sunflower (Helianthus × laetiflorus)
  - Common sunflower (Helianthus annuus)
  - Giant sunflower (Helianthus giganteus)
  - Hairy sunflower (Helianthus hirsutus)
  - Maximilian's sunflower (Helianthus maximiliani)
  - Nuttall's sunflower (Helianthus nuttallii ssp. rydbergii; special concern)
  - Prairie sunflower (Helianthus petiolaris var. petiolaris)
  - Sawtooth sunflower (Helianthus grosseserratus)
  - Stiff sunflower (Helianthus pauciflorus)
  - Tickseed sunflower (Bidens aristosa)
  - Western sunflower (Helianthus occidentalis var. occidentalis)
  - Woodland sunflower (Helianthus strumosus)
  - For early sunflower, see ox-eye.

== T ==
- Tarragon (Artemisia dracunculus)
- Touch-me-nots
  - Pale touch-me-not (Impatiens pallida)
  - Spotted touch-me-not (Impatiens capensis)
- Trilliums
  - Drooping trillium (Trillium flexipes)
  - Large-flowered trillium (Trillium grandiflorum)
  - Nodding trillium (Trillium cernuum var. macranthum)
  - Snow trillium (Trillium nivale)
- Twinflower (Linnaea borealis var. longiflora)
- Twistedstalks
  - Clasping leaved twistedstalk (Streptopus amplexifolius)
  - Rose twistedstalk (Streptopus roseus var. longipes)
- Twinflower (Linnaea borealis var. longiflora)
- Twistedstalks
  - Clasping leaved twistedstalk (Streptopus amplexifolius)
  - Rose twistedstalk (Streptopus roseus var. longipes)

== V ==
- Violets
  - Arrow-leaved violet (Viola sagittata)
  - Bearded birdfoot violet (Viola palmata var. pedatifida)
  - Beardless birdfoot violet (Viola pedata)
  - Big-leaved white violet (Viola blanda)
  - Common blue violet (Viola sororia)
  - Dog violet (Viola conspersa)
  - Great-spurred violet (Viola selkirkii)
  - Kidney-leaved violet (Viola renifolia)
  - Marsh violet (Viola cucullata)
  - Lance-leaved violet (Viola lanceolata; threatened)
  - New England violet (Viola novae-angliae)
  - Northern bog violet (Viola nephrophylla)
  - Northern white violet (Viola macloskeyi var. pallens)
  - Rugulose violet (Viola canadensis var. rugulosa)
  - Sand violet (Viola adunca)
  - Yellow prairie violet (Viola nuttallii; threatened)
  - Yellow violet (Viola pubescens)
- Violet wood sorrel (Oxalis violacea)
- Virginia mountain mint (Pycnanthemum virginianum)

== W ==
- White camas (Zigadenus elegans)
- Wild bergamot or bee-balm (Monarda fistulosa)
- Wild calla (Calla palustris)
- Wild licorice (Glycyrrhiza lepidota)
- Wild onions
  - Nodding wild onion (Allium cernuum)
  - Prairie wild onion (Allium stellatum)
  - White wild onion (Allium textile)
- Wild sweet William (Phlox maculata)
- Wintergreen (Gaultheria procumbens)
- Wolfberry (Symphoricarpos occidentalis)
- Wood betony (Pedicularis canadensis)
- Wood lily (Lilium philadelphicum var. andinum)
- Wormwoods
  - Sage wormwood (Artemisia frigida)
  - Tall wormwood (Artemisia campestris)
