= Velvety goldenrod =

Velvety goldenrod or velvet goldenrod is a common name for several plants and may refer to:

- Solidago mollis, native to central North America
- Solidago velutina, native to western North America
