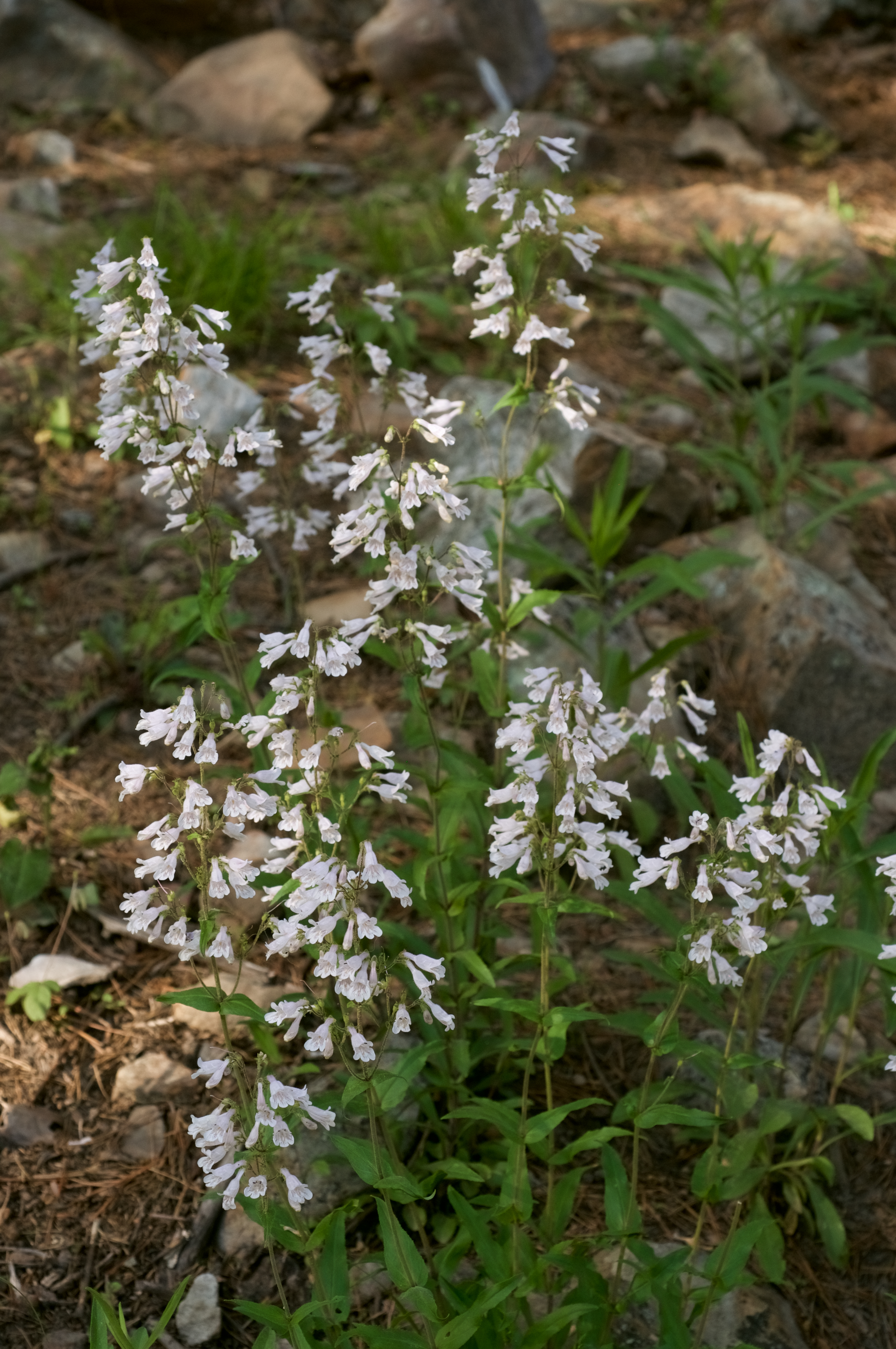

Conservation status
- Secure (NatureServe)

Scientific classification
- Kingdom: Plantae
- Clade: Tracheophytes
- Clade: Angiosperms
- Clade: Eudicots
- Clade: Asterids
- Order: Lamiales
- Family: Plantaginaceae
- Genus: Penstemon
- Species: P. arkansanus

Binomial name
- Penstemon arkansanus Pennell

= Penstemon arkansanus =

Species of flowering plant

Penstemon arkansanus is a species of flowering plant in the plantain family known by the common name Arkansas beardtongue. It is endemic to Texas, Arkansas, Oklahoma, Missouri, and Illinois in the United States, occurring in rocky or sandy soils of shale or sandstone.

== Description ==
Penstemon arkansanus is a perennial herb with clustered stems growing 30–60 cm (12–24 in) tall. The stems are greyish and puberulent, often turning purplish. The leaves are also finely puberulent, with the longest leaves measuring 7–10 cm (2.8–3.9 in) long. The thyrse makes up just less than half of the plant, with three to nine fascicles that are each composed of two axillary branches. The pedicels are shorter than the main peduncle. The sepals are 2–3 mm (0.079–0.118 in) long during anthesis and 4–5 mm (0.16–0.20 in) long when the plant is fruiting. The white corolla is 15–17 mm (0.59–0.67 in) long and has purplish veins internally on its anterior. The tube and narrow throat are 11–12 mm (0.43–0.47 in) long. The glabrous capsule is 6–7 mm (0.24–0.28 in) long and hidden when mature. The plant differs from Penstemon pallidus only in its tendency to be more glabrous.

The plant flowers from late May into early June.

== See also ==
List of Penstemon species
