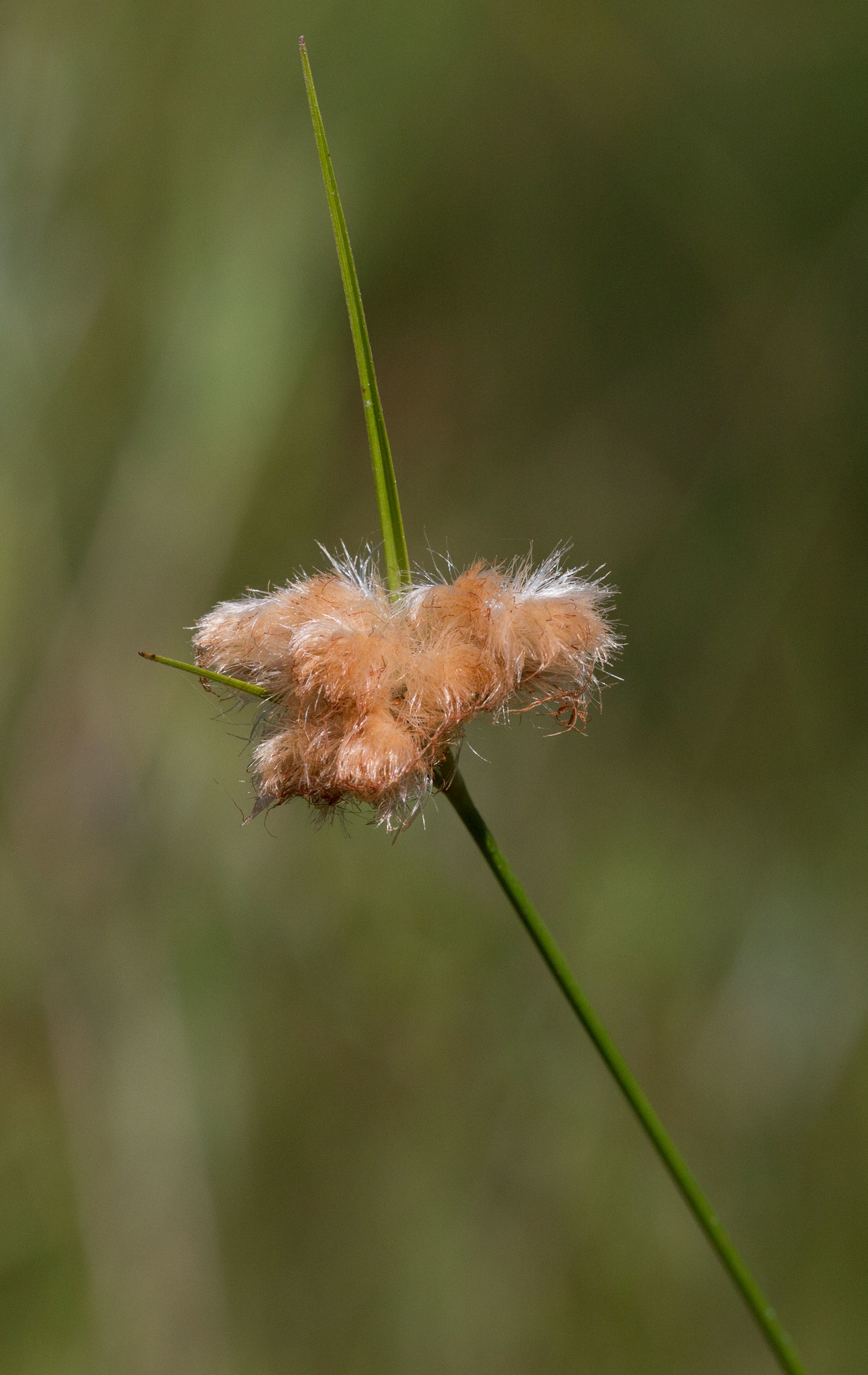
- Morristown, Vermont, USA (July 25)

Conservation status
- Secure (NatureServe)

Scientific classification
- Kingdom: Plantae
- Clade: Tracheophytes
- Clade: Angiosperms
- Clade: Monocots
- Clade: Commelinids
- Order: Poales
- Family: Cyperaceae
- Genus: Eriophorum
- Species: E. virginicum

Binomial name
- Eriophorum virginicum L.

Synonyms
- Homotypic synonyms: Eriophoropsis virginica (L.) Palla; Scirpus virginicus (L.) T.Koyama; Heterotypic synonyms: Eriophorum confertissimum Alph.Wood; Eriophorum virginianum Houtt.; Eriophorum virginicum var. album A.Gray; Eriophorum virginicum f. album (A.Gray) Wiegand; Eriophorum virginicum var. confertissimum (Alph.Wood) Alph.Wood; Eriophorum virginicum var. gracile Torr.

= Eriophorum virginicum =

Species of flowering plant

Eriophorum virginicum, the tawny cottongrass, is a species of flowering plant in the sedge family Cyperaceae. It is native to eastern North America but was introduced into both British Columbia and Washington in western North America. It is most common in eastern Canada, New England, and the Great Lakes region. It is the only species of Eriophorum in North America that occurs in the southeastern United States, where it is uncommon. The common name refers to the tawny color of its fruiting head. Despite the name, it is a sedge, not a grass, and it is sometimes called tawny cottonsedge to emphasize this fact.

== Description ==
Eriophorum virginicum is a perennial herbaceous plant that forms colonies by means of long-creeping rhizomes. Each stem (or culm) in the colony grows to 120 cm (47 in) long. The terminal inflorescence comprises 2–10 spikelets, each on a peduncle between 2 and 10 mm long. The inflorescence is subtended by 2–5 leaf-like bracts, the longest of which is 4 to 12 cm (2 to 5 in) in length. Individual flowers have 10 or more perianth bristles that are brown in color (at least at the base). Rarely the bristles are entirely white.

Typically the fruiting head is densely packed, which tends to obscure the spikelets. Despite this, Eriophorum virginicum is rather easy to distinguish from other cottongrasses due to its late fruiting time and distinctive color.

== Taxonomy ==
Eriophorum virginicum was first described by the Swedish botanist Carl Linnaeus in 1753. Linnaeus based his diagnosis on a specimen collected in Virginia, hence the specific epithet virginicum and the common name Virginia cottongrass.

Eriophorum virginicum was segregated to a new genus Eriophoropsis by the Austrian botanist and mycologist Eduard Palla in 1896. Later, in 1958, it was segregated to the existing genus Scirpus Tourn. ex L. by the Japanese botanist and collector Tetsuo Michael Koyama. As of July 2024, both Eriophoropsis virginica (L.) Palla and Scirpus virginicus (L.) T.Koyama are considered to be synonyms for Eriophorum virginicum L.

Eriophorum virginicum var. album was described by the American botanist Asa Gray in 1876. Variety album has white (not brown) bristles. In 1924, the American botanist Karl McKay Wiegand reduced the variety to forma. Both names are considered to be synonyms for Eriophorum virginicum L.

Eriophorum virginicum, together with Eriophorum tenellum and Eriophorum gracile, form a strongly supported clade that is sister to the rest of the genus. The clade is distinguished by having glumes (scales at the base of each flower in a spikelet) with many prominent nerves whereas the glumes of the remaining species possess a single prominent midnerve.

== Distribution and habitat ==
Eriophorum virginicum is native to eastern North America, from Newfoundland and Labrador in Canada to South Carolina in the United States (U.S.), ranging as far west as Minnesota. It was introduced into British Columbia in western Canada, where it is confined to bog habitat in the Fraser Valley. It was also introduced into similar habitat in Skagit County, Washington. In the U.S., it is most common in New England and the Great Lakes region. It is the only species of Eriophorum in North America that occurs in the southeastern U.S., where it is least common. Disjunct populations occur throughout the southeastern states, with the southernmost population occurring in Taylor County, Georgia.

Eriophorum virginicum is an obligate wetland (OBL) species. In New England, it prefers bogs, acidic fens, and wet meadows.

== Ecology ==
Eriophorum virginicum is a perennial flowering plant that flowers in the early summer. After the flowers are pollinated, cotton-like fruiting heads develop between mid-summer and early autumn. In Minnesota, for example, fruiting occurs from July to September.

Seasonal growth stages

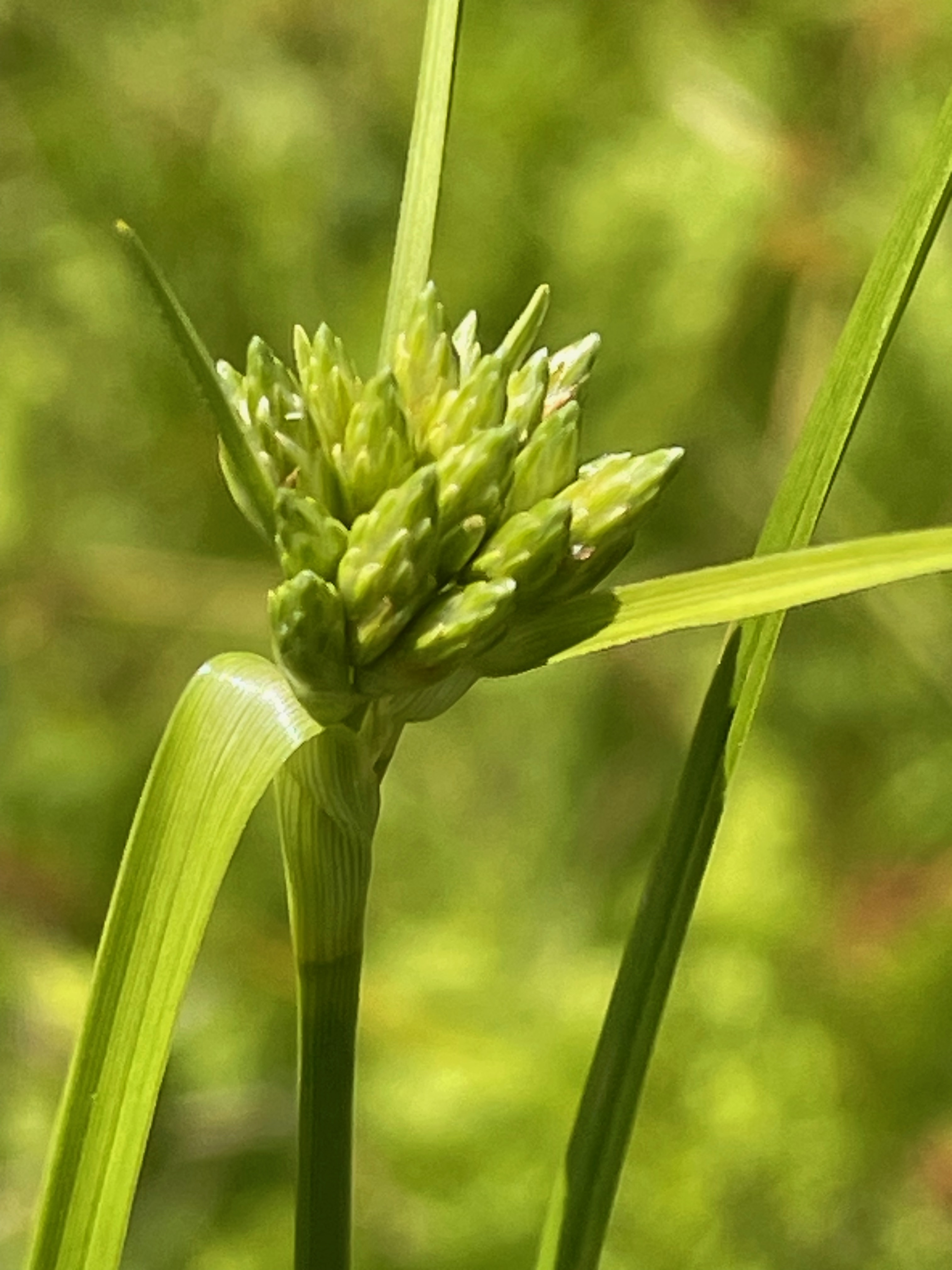
With flower buds, observed in Strafford, Vermont on July 2

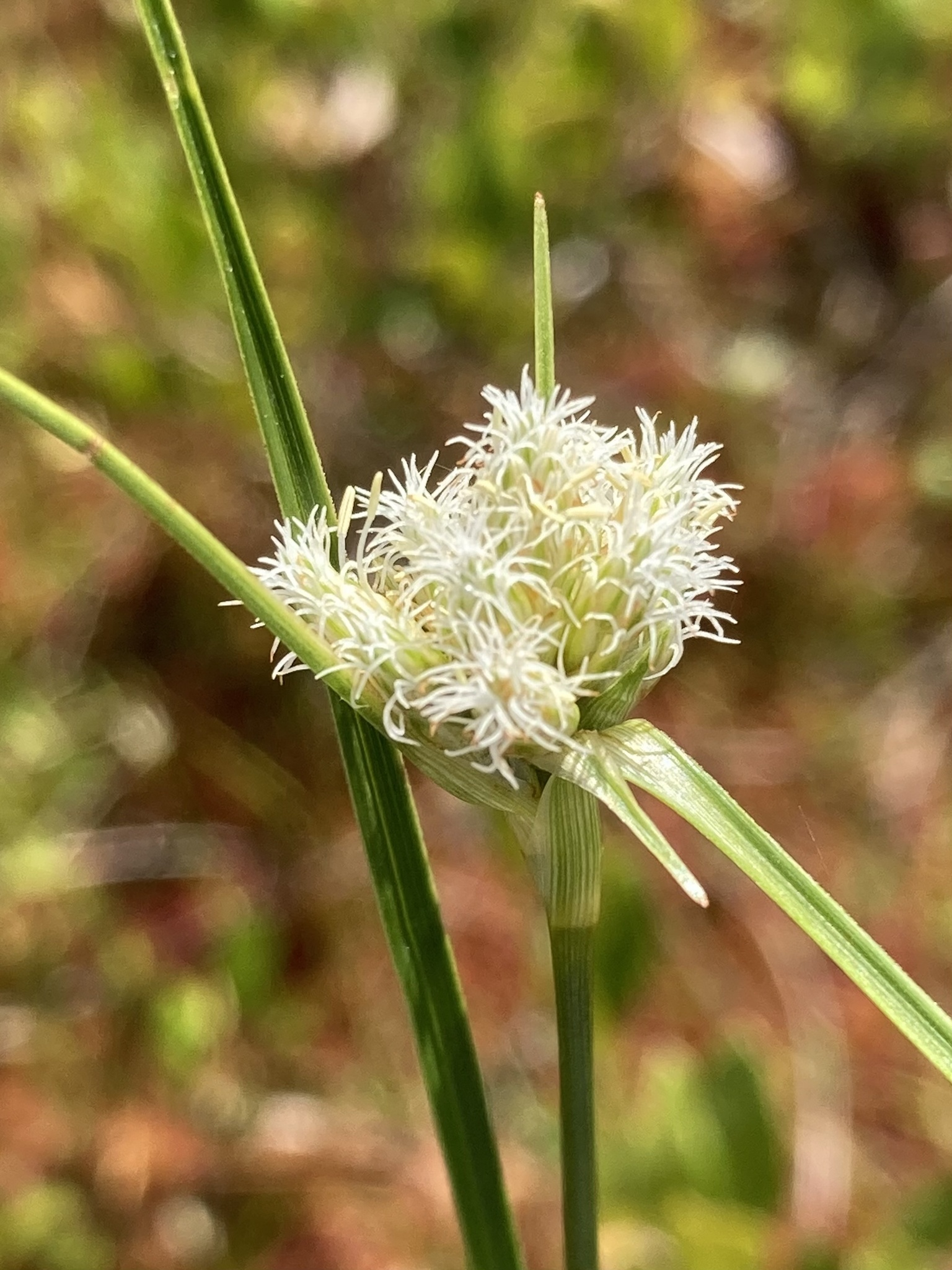
With flowering head, observed in Franklin County, Massachusetts on July 8

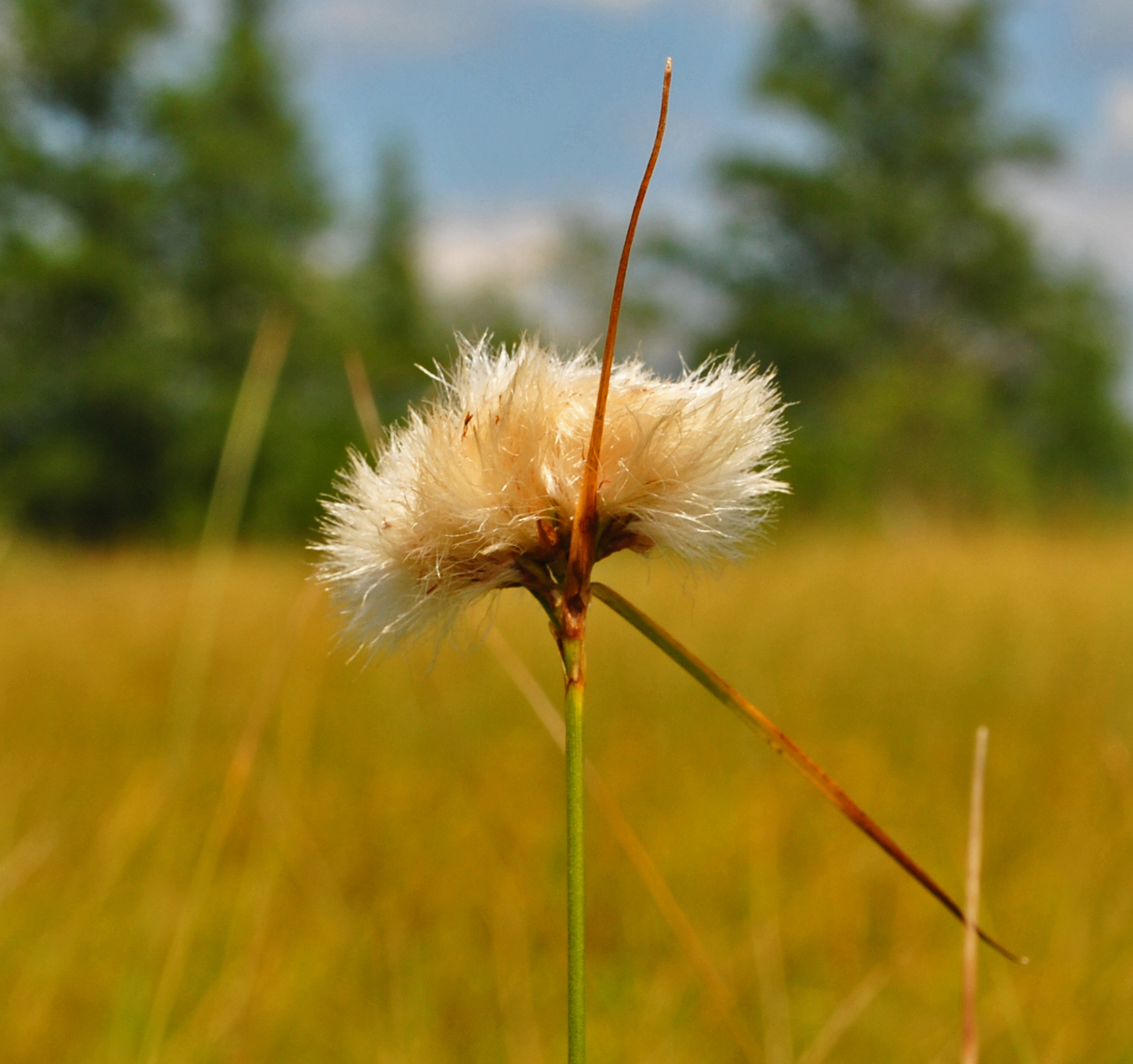
With fruiting head, observed in Jackson County, Wisconsin on August 17

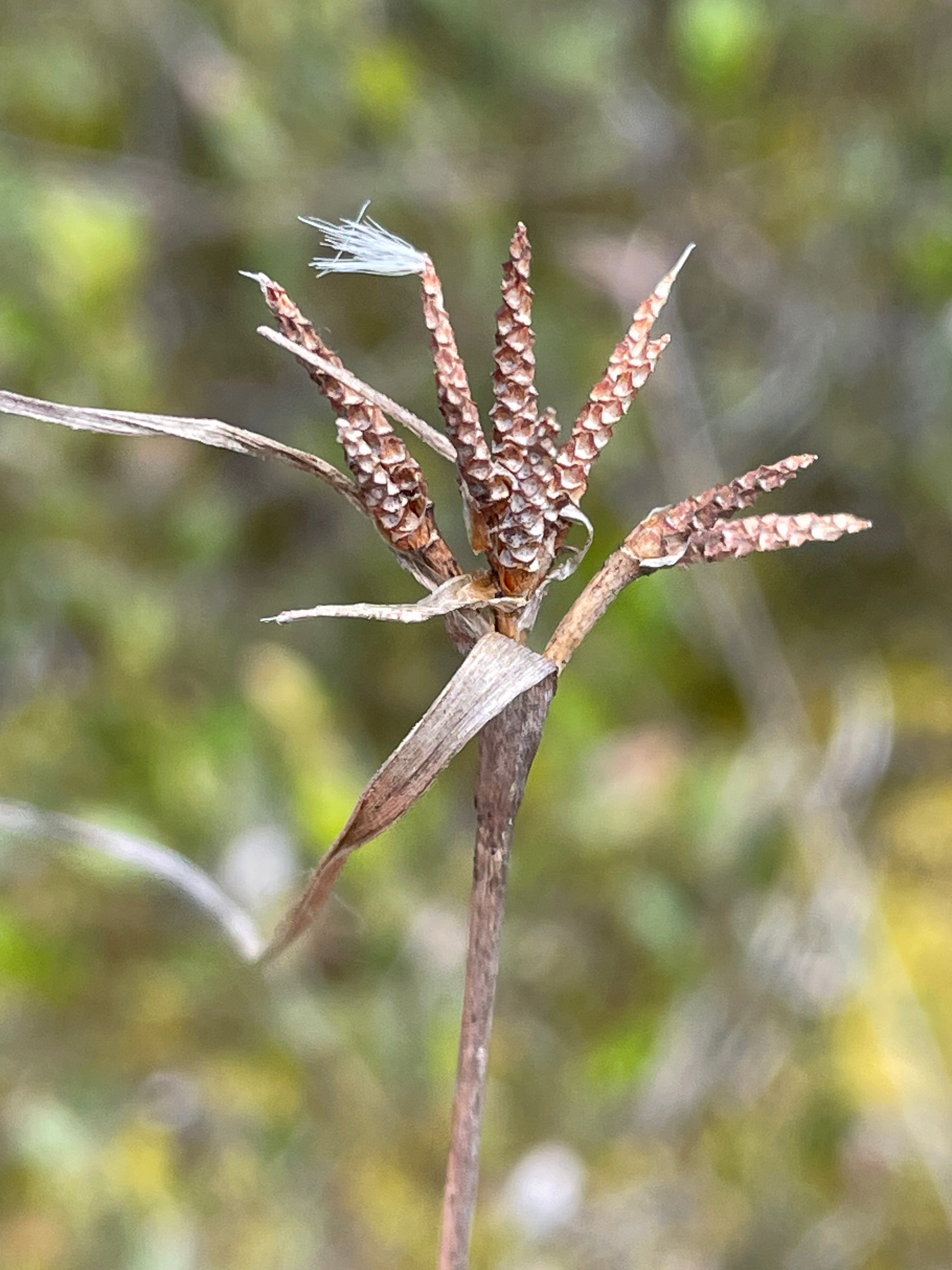
With persistent plant parts, observed in Benson, Vermont on June 27 of the following season

== Conservation ==
As of November 2025, Eriophorum virginicum is a species of greatest conservation need in the U.S. state of Georgia. It is critically imperiled (S1) in Delaware, Georgia, Illinois, Iowa, Kentucky, South Carolina, and Tennessee.

== Bibliography ==
- Gilman, Arthur V. (2015). New Flora of Vermont. Memoirs of The New York Botanical Garden, Volume 110. Bronx, New York, USA: The New York Botanical Garden Press. ISBN 978-0-89327-516-7.
- Gledhill, David (2008). The Names of Plants (4th ed.). Cambridge University Press. ISBN 978-0-521-86645-3.
- Haines, Arthur (2011). New England Wild Flower Society's Flora Novae Angliae: A Manual for the Identification of Native and Naturalized Higher Vascular Plants of New England. Illustrated by Elizabeth Farnsworth and Gordon Morrison. Yale University Press. ISBN 978-0-300-17154-9.
- Léveillé-Bourret, Étienne (2018). Evolution and classification of the Cariceae-Dulichieae-Scirpeae Clade (Cyperaceae) (PhD). University of Ottawa.
- Lichvar, R.W.; Banks, D.L.; Kirchner, W.N.; Melvin, N.C. (28 April 2016). "The National Wetland Plant List: 2016 wetland ratings" (PDF). Phytoneuron. 2016–30: 1–17. ISSN 2153-733X.
- Linnaeus, Carl (1753). Species Plantarum: exhibentes plantas rite cognitas, ad genera relatas, cum differentiis specificis, nominibus trivialibus, synonymis selectis, locis natalibus, secundum systema sexuale digestas (1st ed.). Stockholm: Impensis Laurentii Salvii.
