= Persistence (botany) =

Retention of plant organs that normally are shed

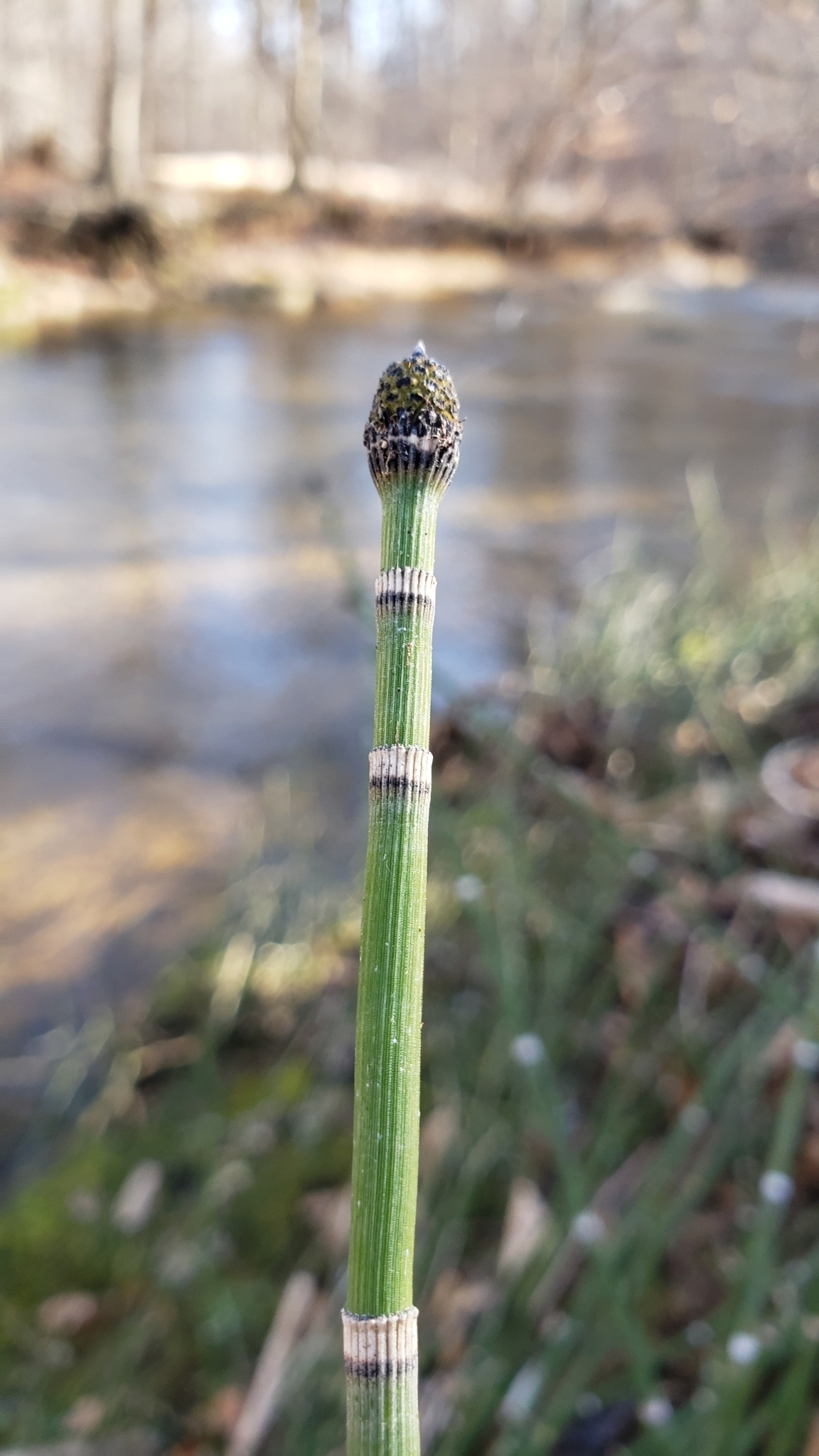
Equisetum praealtum with persistent stem in March

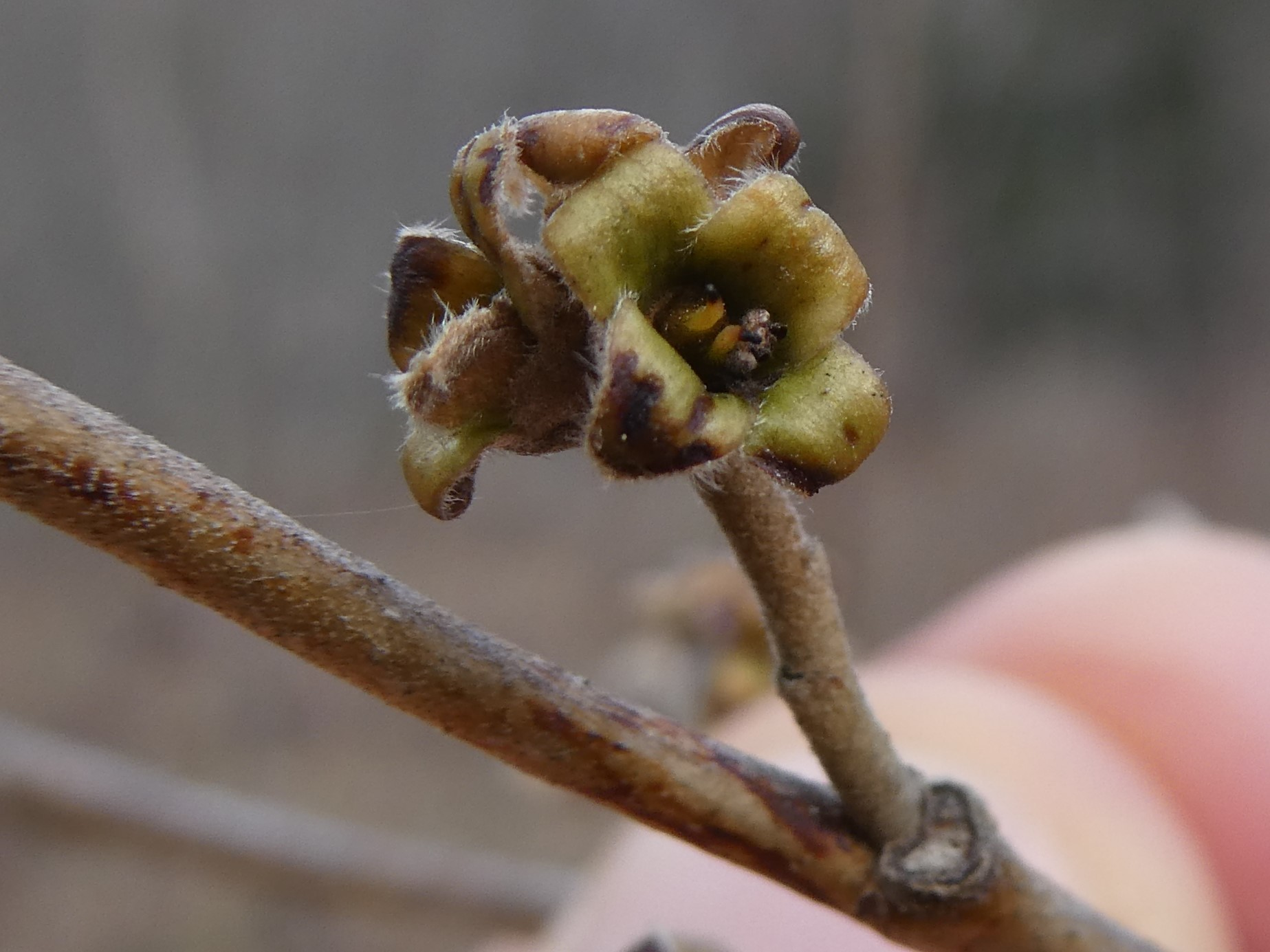
Hamamelis virginiana with persistent calyx in April

Persistence is the retention of plant organs, such as flowers, seeds, or leaves, after their normal function has been completed, in contrast with the shedding of deciduous organs after their purpose has been fulfilled. Absence or presence of persistent plant organs can be a helpful clue in plant identification, and may be one of many types of anatomical details noted in the species descriptions or dichotomous keys of plant identification guides. Many species of woody plants with persistent fruit provide an important food source for birds and other wildlife in winter.

The terms persistent and deciduous are not used in a consistent manner by botanists. Related terms such as long-persistent, generally deciduous, and caducous suggest that some plant parts are more persistent than others. However, these terms lack clear definitions.

== Species with persistent parts ==
There are numerous herbaceous and woody plant species that produce persistent parts such as bud scales, sepals (calyx), fronds, fruits, seeds, strobili (cones) or styles. Note that the trait of persistence exhibited by a given species within a genus may not be exhibited by all species within the genus. For example, the Equisetum genus includes some species that have persistent strobili while other species have deciduous strobili.

Species	Persistent part
Berberis bealei (leatherleaf mahonia)	bud scales
Berberis swaseyi (Texas barberry)	bud scales
Berberis trifoliolata (agarita)	bud scales
Hamamelis virginiana (common witch-hazel)	calyx
Matteuccia struthiopteris (ostrich fern)	frond
Onoclea sensibilis (sensitive fern)	frond
Aronia arbutifolia (red chokeberry)	fruit
Berberis thunbergii (Japanese barberry)	fruit
Cephalanthus occidentalis (buttonbush)	fruit
Chimaphila umbellata (umbellate wintergreen)	fruit
Clethra alnifolia (sweet pepperbush)	fruit
Cornus florida (flowering dogwood)	fruit
Cotoneaster apiculatus (cranberry cotoneaster)	fruit
Crataegus phaenopyrum (Washington hawthorn)	fruit
Hamamelis virginiana (common witch-hazel)	fruit
Ilex verticillata (winterberry)	fruit
Malus coronaria (sweet crabapple)	fruit
Malus sargentii (Sargent crabapple)	fruit
Orthilia secunda (one-sided wintergreen)	fruit
Oxydendrum arboreum (sourwood)	fruit
Rhus typhina (staghorn sumac)	fruit
Allium tricoccum (ramp)	seed
Eriophorum virginicum (tawny cottongrass)	seed
Equisetum praealtum (rough horsetail)	stem
Larix occidentalis (western larch)	strobilus
Picea mariana (black spruce)	strobilus
Pinus banksiana (Jack pine)	strobilus
Clematis terniflora (sweet autumn clematis)	style
Orthilia secunda (one-sided wintergreen)	style

Common witch-hazel (Hamamelis virginiana) may have a persistent calyx or a persistent fruit (or both at the same time). After flowering in the fall, the sepals (calyx) and pollinated ovary persist during the winter months. After the ovary is fertilized in the spring, it fuses with the calyx to form a greenish fruit, which eventually becomes woody and brown. In the fall, the ripe fruit suddenly splits, explosively dispersing black seeds up to 10 m (33 ft). The empty capsule persists after the seeds are dispersed.

== Image gallery ==
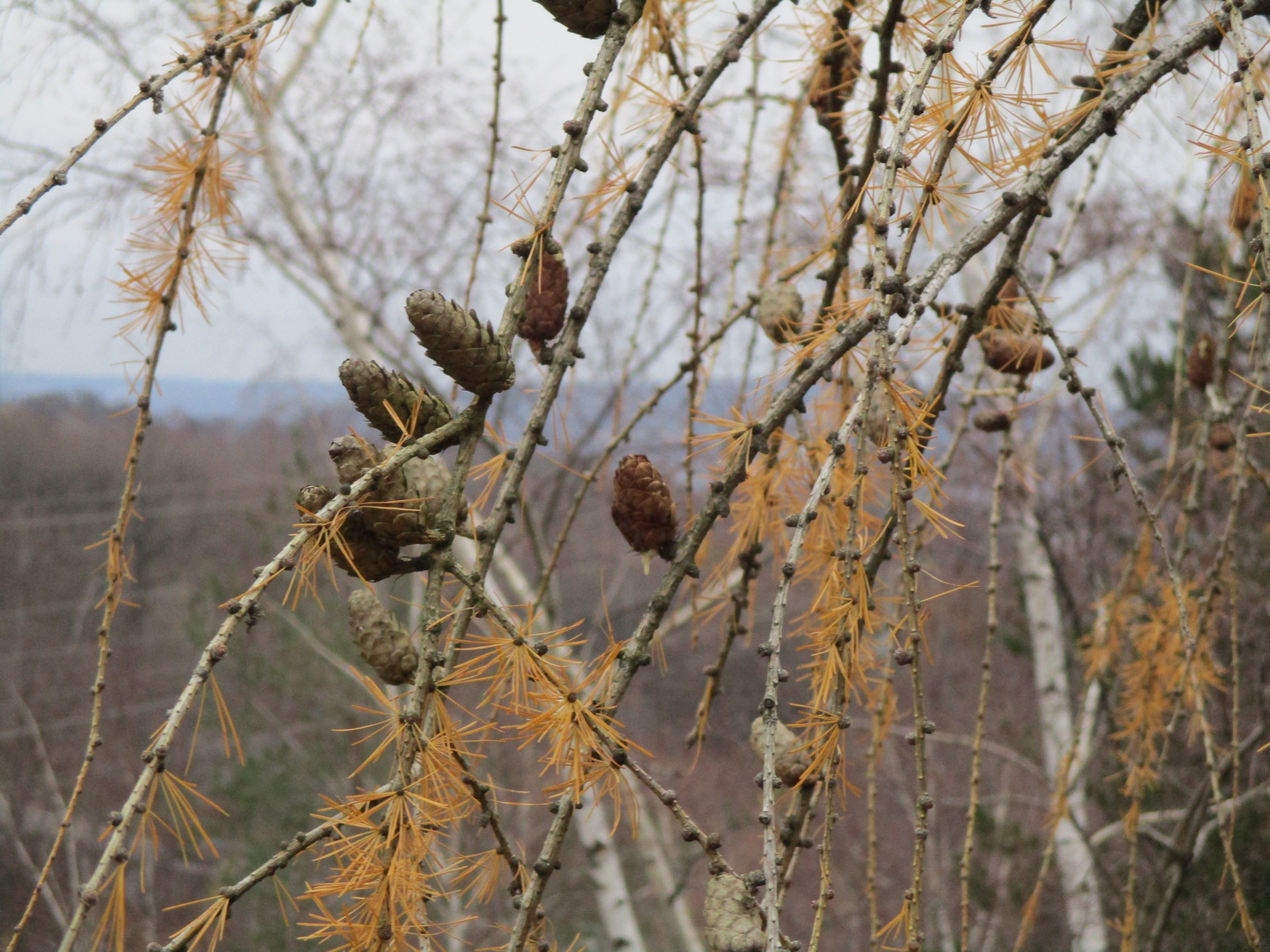
Larix decidua has persistent seed cones.

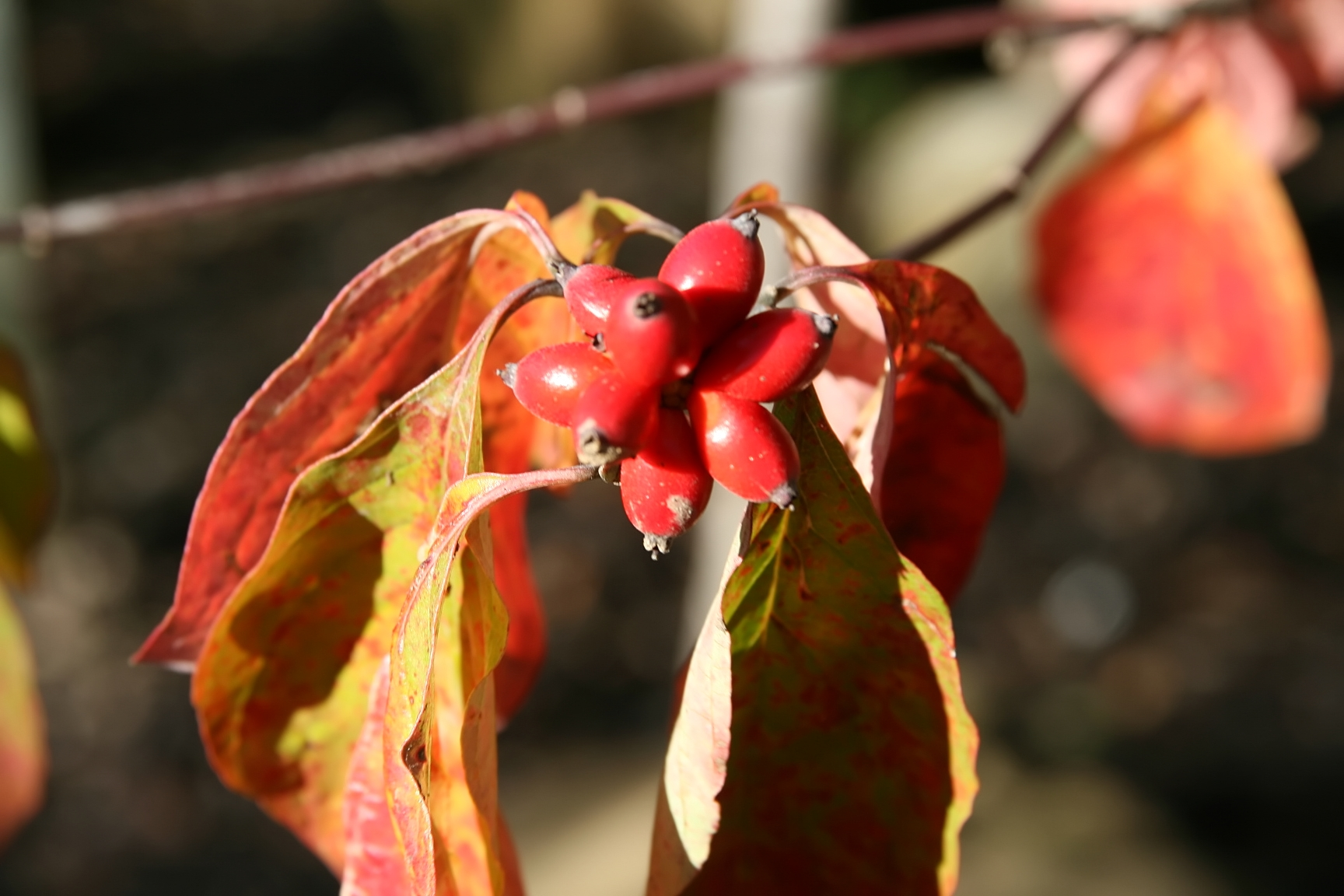
This Cornus florida cultivar has persistent fruit into winter.

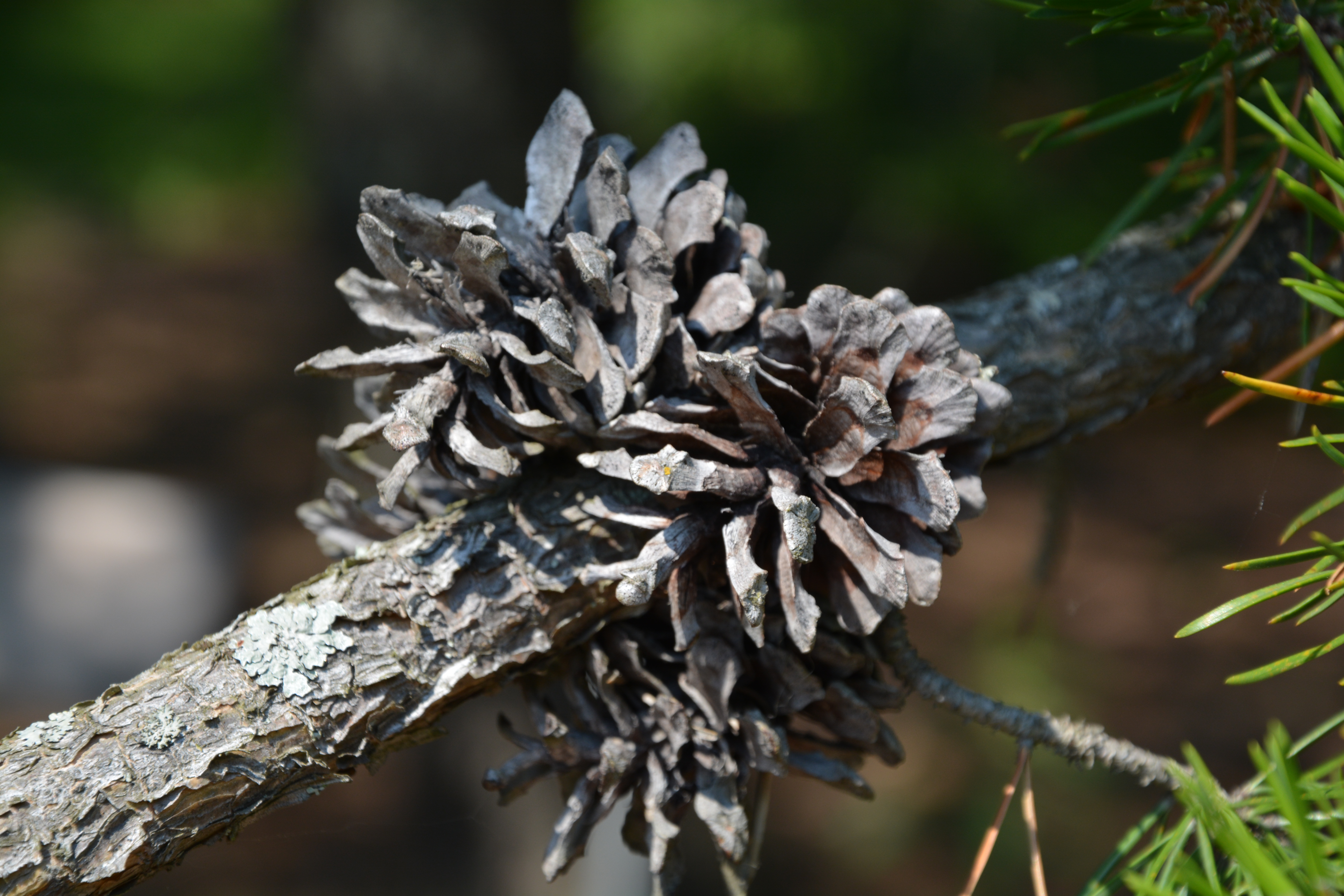
Seed cones of Pinus banksiana persist on branches long after seeds are released.

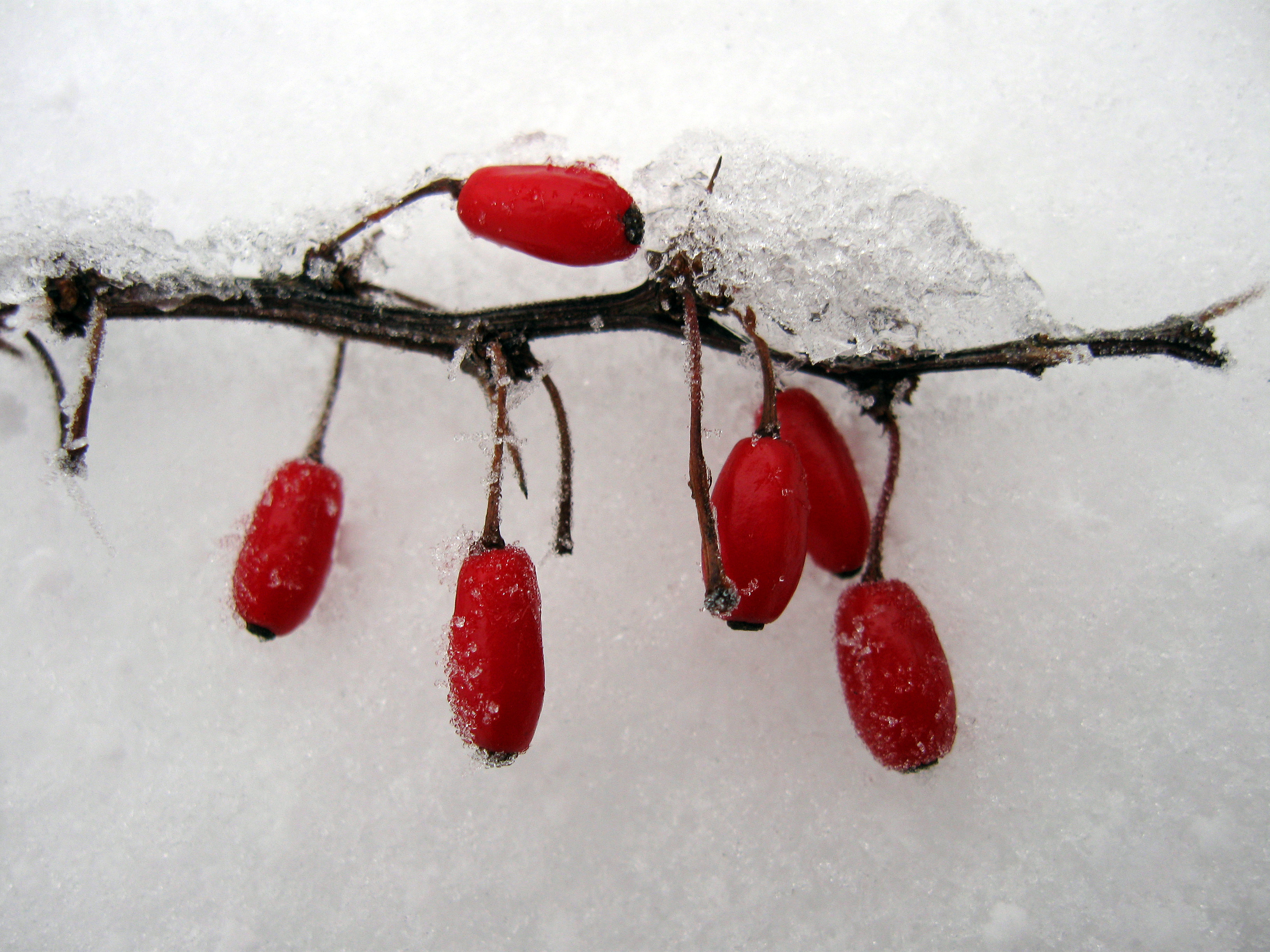
Berberis thunbergii has persistent fruit.

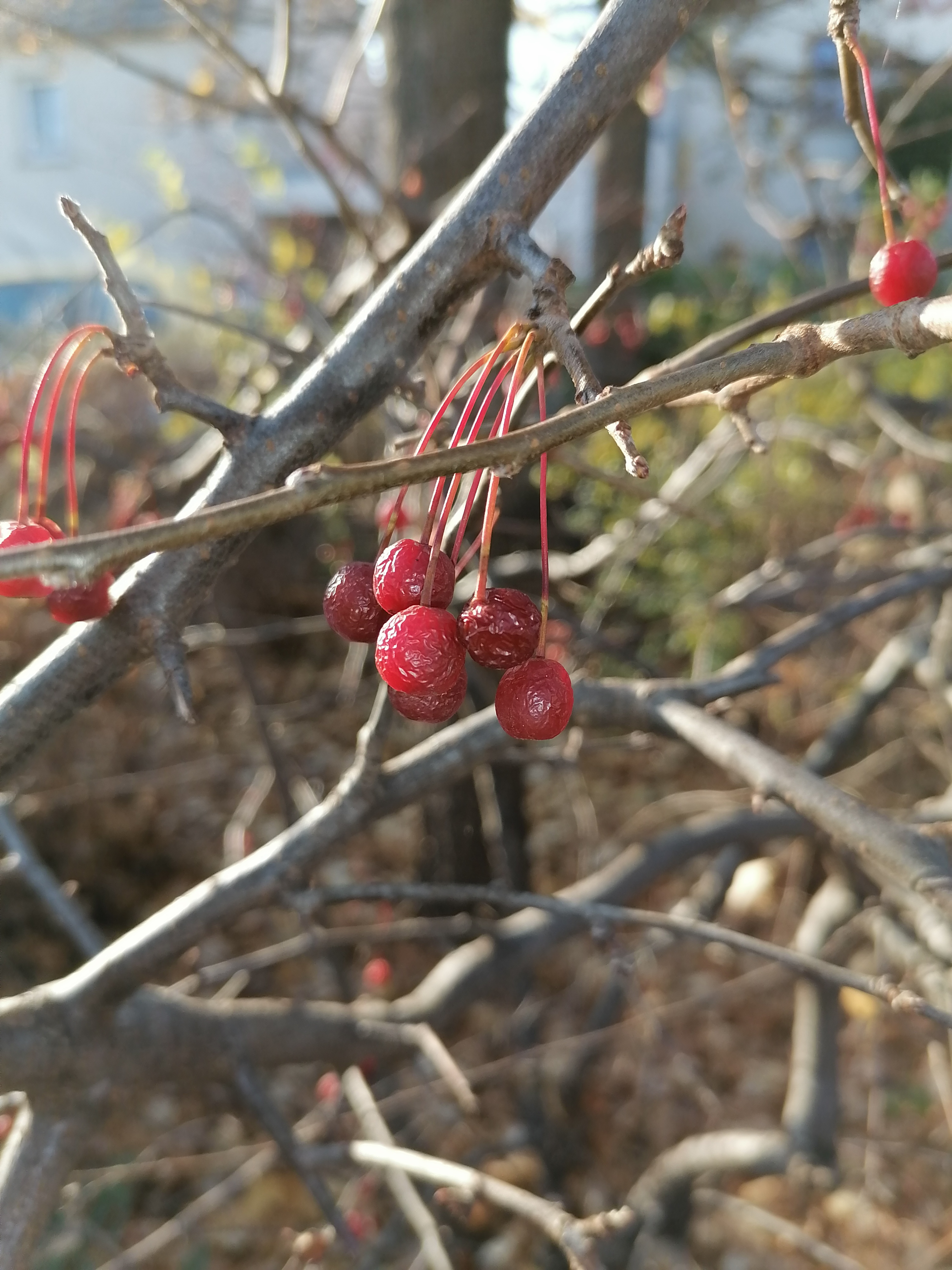
Malus sargentii has persistent fruit.

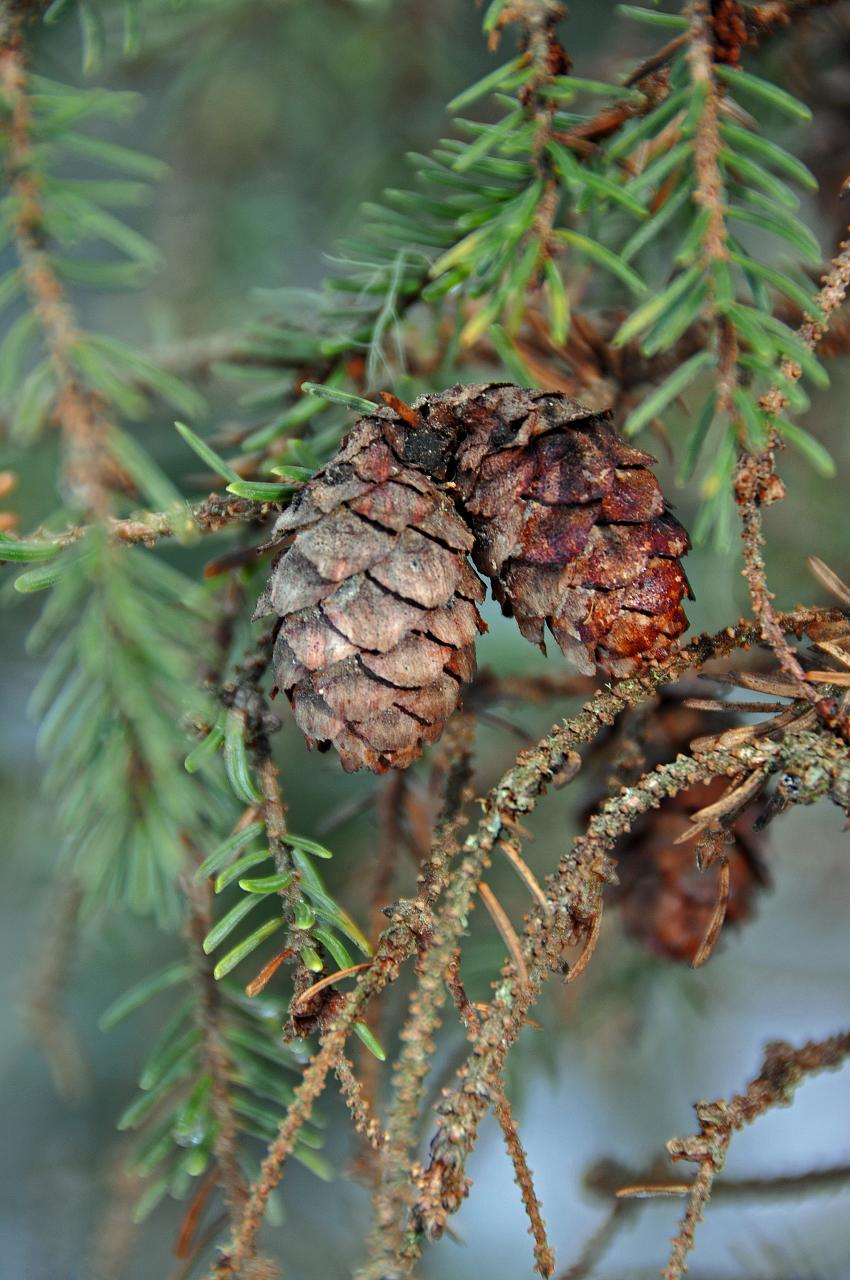
Serotinous seed cones of Picea mariana persist even after fire has caused the seeds to be released.

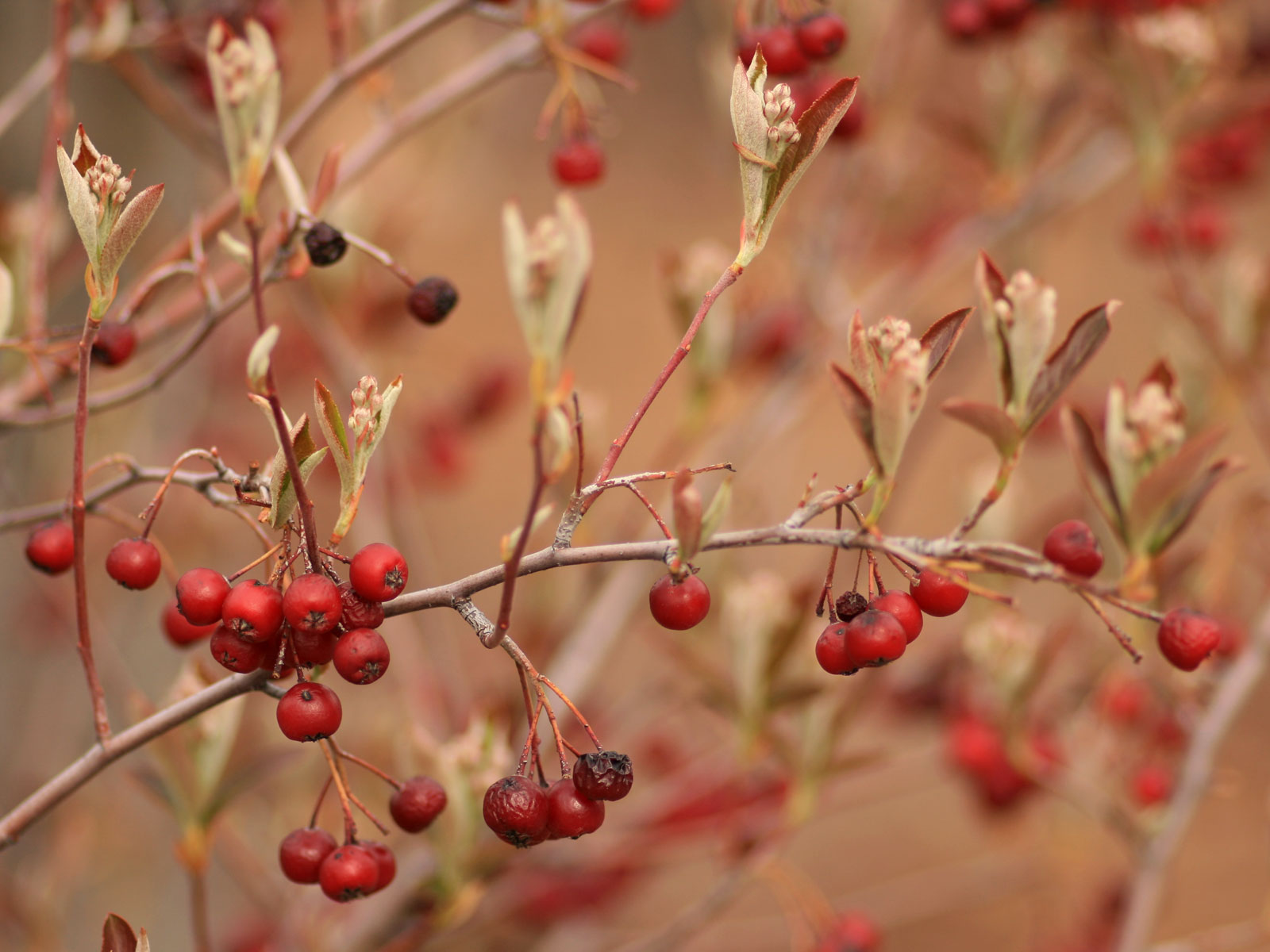
Fruit of this Aronia arbutifolia cultivar persist through the winter and into early spring when new buds are emerging.

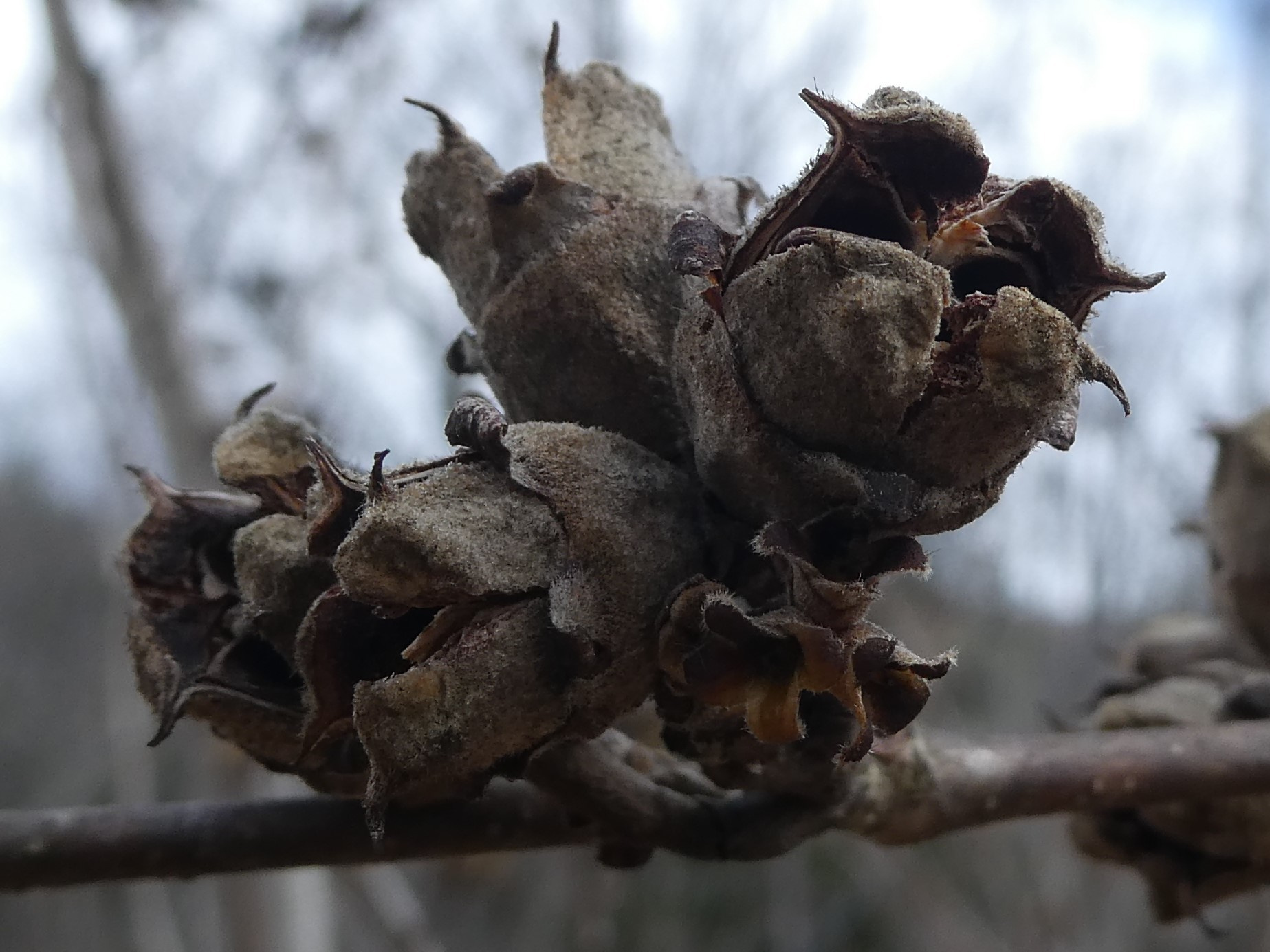
Hamamelis virginiana with persistent fruit in April

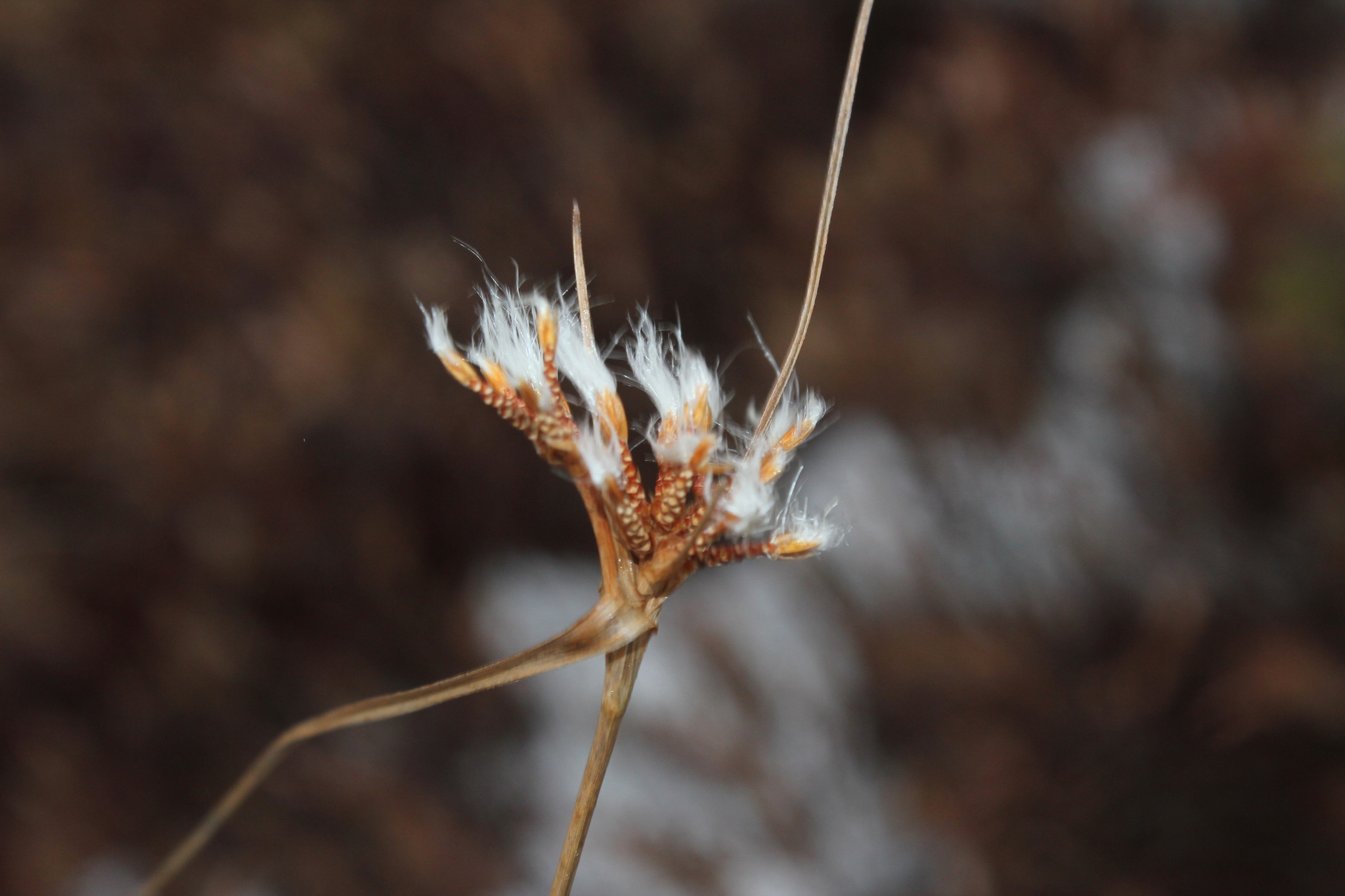
Eriophorum virginicum with persistent seeds in March

== See also ==
- Evergreen
- Semi-deciduous
- Marcescence

== Bibliography ==
- Pojar, Jim; MacKinnon, Andy (1994). Plants of the Pacific Northwest Coast (2nd ed.). Lone Pine. ISBN 978-1-55105-530-5.
