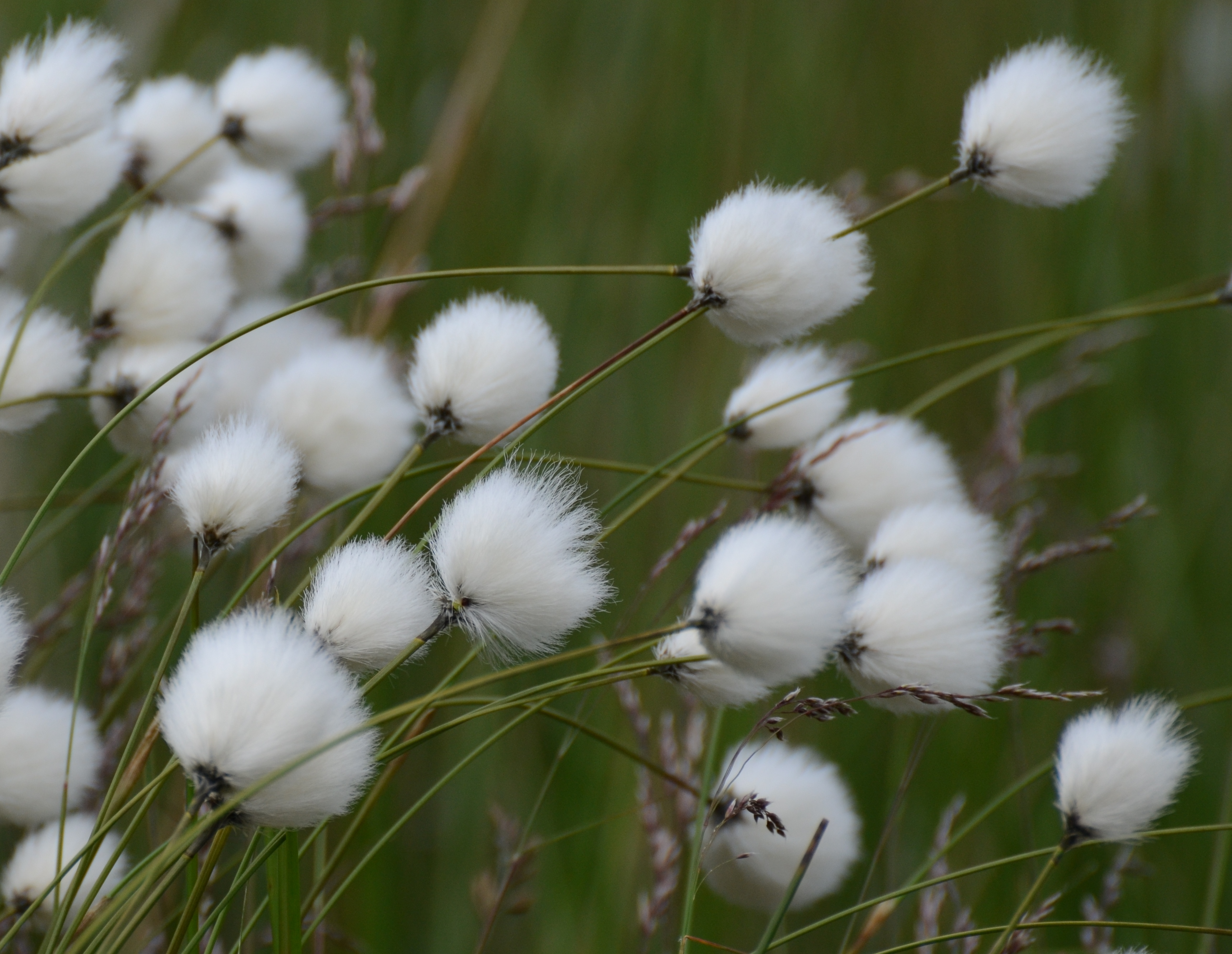
- Eriophorum vaginatum

Scientific classification
- Kingdom: Plantae
- Clade: Tracheophytes
- Clade: Angiosperms
- Clade: Monocots
- Clade: Commelinids
- Order: Poales
- Family: Cyperaceae
- Genus: Eriophorum; L.

Type species
- Eriophorum vaginatum L.

Synonyms
- Heterotypic synonyms: Eriophoropsis Palla; Leucoma Ehrh.; Linagrostis Guett.; Plumaria Bubani; Plumaria Heist. ex Fabr.

= Eriophorum =

Genus of flowering plants in the sedge family

Eriophorum (cottongrass, cotton-grass or cottonsedge) is a genus of flowering plants in the family Cyperaceae, the sedge family. They are found in the cool temperate, alpine, and Arctic regions of the Northern Hemisphere, primarily in the middle latitudes of North America, Europe, and Asia.

== Description ==
Eriophorium species are perennial herbaceous plants that persist by means of underground rhizomes. Stems (called culms) grow singly or in clumps (i.e., cespitose). Both basal leaves and stem leaves are present, although the latter are bladeless in some species. The terminal inflorescence is either a single erect spikelet or multiple spikelets on peduncles of various lengths. In the case of multiple spikelets, the inflorescence is subtended by one or more leaf-like bracts. Individual flowers have 10 or more smooth perianth bristles that greatly elongate and remain attached to the achene during fruiting. The bristles facilitate seed dispersal by wind. In cold Arctic regions, the bristles also serve as insulation by trapping solar radiation and thereby increasing the temperature of the reproductive organs.

Identification keys often begin with a pair of alternatives that implicitly divide the genus into two mutually exclusive sections:

- Eriophorum section Vaginata: one erect spikelet; no leaf-like bracts at the base of the inflorescence; stem leaves absent or, if present, either bladeless or with blade not more than 1 cm long
- Eriophorum section Phyllanthela: multiple spikelets (rarely one); one or more leaf-like bracts at the base of the inflorescence; uppermost stem leaf with a blade at least 1 cm long

Besides the number of spikelets and the presence of bracts and stem leaves, other characters may be used for identification, including: the length of the uppermost leaf blade relative to its sheath; the number of bracts (0, 1, or more than 1); the length and orientation of the bracts; the length of the peduncles; and the color of the bristles.

== Taxonomy ==
In the first edition of Species Plantarum published in 1753, the Swedish botanist Carl Linnaeus established genus Eriophorum by recognizing four species: Eriophorum vaginatum, Eriophorum polystachion, Eriophorum virginicum, and Eriophorum alpinum. In the second edition published in 1762, Linnaeus added a fifth species, Eriophorum cyperinum. The name Eriophorum L. is the primary generic name in use today. Although the names of some of the species have changed, the number of recognized taxa in genus Eriophorum has remained more-or-less the same since 1994.

In the fifth edition of Genera Plantarum published in 1754 (intended to accompany the first edition of Species Plantarum), Linnaeus referenced the prior work of the Italian botanist Pier Antonio Micheli and the French botanist Joseph Pitton de Tournefort. In 1729, Micheli described genus Linagrostis, including an illustration of an unidentified plant. (The plant was later identified to be Eriophorum vaginatum.) Tournefort coined the French name Linaigrette (Latin: Linagrostis) in 1694, but his contribution became better known in Europe when his book was translated to Latin in 1719.

The French naturalist and mineralogist Jean-Étienne Guettard resurrected the pre-Linnaean name Linagrostis in 1750, and again in 1754, but Linagrostis Guett. is regarded as a synonym for Eriophorum L. After Guettard, the name Linagrostis was redescribed by numerous botanists, including John Hill (1756), Johann Gottfried Zinn (1757), and Giovanni Antonio Scopoli (1771), but all three published illegitimate names since Linagrostis Guett. takes precedence. Scopoli's description of Linagrostis Tourn. ex Scop. is notable, however, since it is explicitly based on the early work of Tournefort. The names Linagrostis vaginata (L.) Scop., Linagrostis alpina (L.) Scop., and Linagrostis polystachia (L.) Scop. are synonyms for the corresponding names introduced by Linnaeus in 1753.

The Austrian botanist and mycologist Eduard Palla established genus Eriophoropsis in 1896 by segregating Eriophorum virginicum into a new genus. The name Eriophoropsis Palla is both a synonym for Eriophorum L. and the basionym of Eriophorum subgen. Eriophoropsis (Palla) Raymond, the latter described by the Canadian botanist Louis-Florent-Marcel Raymond in 1954.

=== Species ===
As of September 2025, the following species are accepted by Plants of the World Online (POWO):

| Name/Author | Year described | Year published | Group | Distribution |
|---|---|---|---|---|
| Eriophorum angustifolium Honck. | 1782 | 1782 | Multispicate | Widespread across Europe, Asia, North America |
| Eriophorum arcticum (M.S.Novos.) Schekhovts. | 1994 | 2023 | Unispicate | Siberia |
| Eriophorum brachyantherum Trautv. & C.A.Mey. | 1856 | 1856 | Unispicate | Scandinavia, northern Russia, Mongolia, Korea, Alaska, northern Canada |
| Eriophorum callitrix Cham. ex C.A.Mey. | 1831 | 1831 | Unispicate | Siberia, Russian Far East, Alaska, Canada, Greenland, Montana, Wyoming |
| Eriophorum chamissonis C.A.Mey. | 1831 | 1831 | Unispicate | Siberia, Russian Far East, Korea, Mongolia, Alaska, Canada, Greenland, northern and western United States |
| Eriophorum gracile Roth | 1799 | 1799 | Multispicate | Much of Europe; northern and Central Asia; China, Tibet, Mongolia, Alaska, Canada, northern United States |
| Eriophorum humile Turcz. | 1838 | 1838 | Unispicate | Altai, Tuva, Kazakhstan, Mongolia, Amur |
| Eriophorum latifolium Hoppe | 1800 | 1800 | Multispicate | Much of Europe; Caucasus, Turkey, Mongolia |
| Eriophorum scheuchzeri Hoppe | 1800 | 1800 | Unispicate | Much of Europe; northern and Central Asia including Siberia, Xinjiang, Himalayas, Alaska, Greenland, Canada, mountains of western United States |
| Eriophorum tenellum Nutt. | 1818 | 1818 | Multispicate | Eastern Canada and northeastern United States from Nunavut and Labrador to New Jersey |
| Eriophorum tolmatchevii M.S.Novos. | 1994 | 1994 | Unispicate | Krasnoyarsk, Yakutiya |
| Eriophorum transiens Raymond | 1959 | 1959 | Multispicate | Guizhou |
| Eriophorum triste (Th.Fr.) Hadac & Á.Löve | 1869 | 1950 | Multispicate | Finland, North America and temperate regions of Asia |
| Eriophorum vaginatum L. | 1753 | 1753 | Unispicate | Widespread across Europe, Asia, North America |
| Eriophorum virginicum L. | 1753 | 1753 | Multispicate | Eastern North America from Labrador to Tennessee, west to Michigan |
| Eriophorum viridicarinatum (Engelm.) Fernald | 1844 | 1905 | Multispicate | Canada including Arctic territories; northern United States |

The following natural hybrids are also accepted by POWO:

| Name/Author (hybrid formula) | Year described | Year published | Distribution |
|---|---|---|---|
| Eriophorum × beringianum Raymond (E. angustifolium × E. chamissonis) | 1957 | 1957 | Alaska including Aleutians; Magadan region of Russia |
| Eriophorum × churchillianum Lepage (E. triste × E. vaginatum) | 1957 | 1957 | Alaska |
| Eriophorum × fellowsii (Fernald) M.S.Novos. (E. virginicum × E. viridicarinatum) | 1905 | 1995 | Ontario, Maine, Massachusetts |
| Eriophorum × gracilifolium M.S.Novos. (E. gracile × E. latifolium) | 1994 | 1994 | European Russia |
| Eriophorum × medium Andersson (E. chamissonis × E. scheuchzeri) | 1857 | 1857 | Scattered locations in Finland, Norway, Russia, Alaska, Quebec, Labrador |
| Eriophorum × pylaieanum Raymond (E. chamissonis × E. vaginatum) | 1951 | 1951 | Scattered locations in Canada and Alaska |
| Eriophorum × rousseauianum Raymond (E. angustifolium × E. scheuchzeri) | 1950 | 1950 | Alaska, Quebec |

World Flora Online (WFO) accepts all of the above species and hybrids except Eriophorum arcticum. In addition, WFO accepts Eriophorum × polystachiovaginatum whereas POWO does not.

==== Other names ====
Of the five species described by Linnaeus in 1753 and 1762, three of the names are no longer in use. Eriophorum polystachion L. is a rejected name, now considered to be a synonym for Eriophorum angustifolium Honck. subsp. angustifolium, while Eriophorum alpinum L. and Eriophorum cyperinum L. are synonyms for Trichophorum alpinum (L.) Pers. and Scirpus cyperinus (L.) Kunth, respectively.

The Swedish mycologist and botanist Elias Magnus Fries described Eriophorum russeolum in 1836. Some authors consider Eriophorum russeolum Fr. to be a synonym for Eriophorum chamissonis C.A.Mey., while others consider the two names to refer to separate species.

In 1942, the American agrostologist and botanist Alan Ackerman Beetle placed the species Scirpus criniger A.Gray into genus Eriophorum. In 2012, Eriophorum crinigerum (A.Gray) Beetle was segregated into genus Calliscirpus, and so Eriophorum crinigerum is a synonym for Calliscirpus criniger (A.Gray) C.N.Gilmour, J.R.Starr & Naczi.

In 1957, the Canadian botanist Louis-Florent-Marcel Raymond placed the species Scirpus scabriculmis Beetle into genus Eriophorum. In 2019, Eriophorum scabriculme (Beetle) Raymond was segregated into genus Trichophorum. Hence Eriophorum scabriculme is a synonym for Trichophorum scabriculme (Beetle) J.R.Starr, Lév.-Bourret & B.A.Ford.

The invalidly published name Eriophorum × polystachiovaginatum Beauverd is a synonym for Eriophorum × beauverdii Soó but the latter is unplaced by POWO.

=== Subdivision ===
In 1849, the Swedish botanist Nils Johan Andersson placed the European species of Eriophorum into two new sections:

Eriophorum section Vaginata:

- Eriophorum vaginatum
- Eriophorum capitatum (a synonym for Eriophorum scheuchzeri)
- Eriophorum russeolum (a synonym for Eriophorum chamissonis)

Eriophorum section Phyllanthela:

- Eriophorum angustifolium
- Eriophorum latifolium
- Eriophorum gracile

In 1905, the American botanist Merritt Lyndon Fernald placed the North American species of Eriophorum into Andersson's sections as follows:

Eriophorum section Vaginata:

- Eriophorum scheuchzeri
- Eriophorum chamissonis
- Eriophorum vaginatum
- Eriophorum callitrix
- Eriophorum opacum n. comb. (a synonym for Eriophorum brachyantherum)

Eriophorum section Phyllanthela:

- Eriophorum gracile
- Eriophorum tenellum
- Eriophorum polystachion (a synonym for Eriophorum angustifolium)
- Eriophorum viridicarinatum n. comb.
- Eriophorum virginicum

=== Phylogeny ===
Based on phylogenetic analyses, Eriophorum forms a well‐supported clade nested within the genus Scirpus, which suggests the latter is paraphyletic. To resolve this issue, there are at least two options: 1) merge Eriophorum into Scirpus, or 2) split Scirpus into a series of new genera. As of August 2024, there has been insufficient data for a majority of botanists to prefer one option or the other.

Eriophorum virginicum, Eriophorum tenellum, and Eriophorum gracile form a strongly supported clade that is sister to the rest of the genus. The clade is distinguished by having glumes (scales at the base of each flower in a spikelet) with many prominent nerves, whereas the glumes of the remaining species possess a single prominent midnerve.

Within a weakly supported clade of unispicate species (i.e., species with a single spikelet), Eriophorum russeolum and Eriophorum scheuchzeri form a strongly supported, monophyletic species complex characterized by a rhizomatous habit, up to 7 sterile glumes, and by glumes with well-defined hyaline margins (i.e., with thin, translucent edges). In contrast, in the sister clade to this complex (Eriophorum vaginatum, Eriophorum brachyantherum, and Eriophorum callitrix) each species has a caespitose habit and more than 12 sterile glumes that generally lack clear hyaline margins.

== Distribution and habitat ==
Eriophorum species are found in the cool temperate, alpine, and Arctic regions of the Northern Hemisphere, primarily in the middle latitudes of North America, Europe, and Asia.

- North America: E. angustifolium, E. brachyantherum, E. callitrix, E. chamissonis, E. gracile, E. scheuchzeri, E. tenellum, E. triste, E. vaginatum, E. virginicum, E. viridicarinatum
- Europe: E. angustifolium, E. brachyantherum, E. chamissonis, E. gracile, E. latifolium, E. scheuchzeri, E. triste, E. vaginatum
- Asia: E. angustifolium, E. arcticum, E. brachyantherum, E. callitrix, E. chamissonis, E. gracile, E. humile, E. latifolium, E. scheuchzeri, E. tolmatchevii, E. transiens, E. triste, E. vaginatum

Preferred habitats include bogs, fens, meadows, and alpine tundra.

== Uses ==
Paper and the wicks of candles have been made of its fiber, and pillows stuffed with the same material. The leaves were formerly used in treating diarrhea, and the spongy pith of the stem for the removal of tapeworm.

== Bibliography ==
- Andersson, Nils Johan (1849). Plantae Scandinaviae descriptionibus et figuris analyticis adumbratae. Fasciculus primus Cyperaceas Scandinaviae complectens. Stockholm.
- Fernald, M. L. (1905a). "The North American species of Eriophorum. Part 1: Synopsis of American species". Rhodora. 7 (77): 81–92.
- Fernald, M. L. (1905b). "The North American species of Eriophorum. Part 2: Notes on the preceding synopsis". Rhodora. 7 (79): 129–136.
- Gilman, Arthur V. (2015). New Flora of Vermont. Memoirs of The New York Botanical Garden, Volume 110. Bronx, New York, USA: The New York Botanical Garden Press. ISBN 978-0-89327-516-7.
- Gledhill, David (2008). The Names of Plants (4th ed.). Cambridge University Press. ISBN 978-0-521-86645-3.
- Haines, Arthur (2011). New England Wild Flower Society's Flora Novae Angliae: A Manual for the Identification of Native and Naturalized Higher Vascular Plants of New England. Illustrated by Elizabeth Farnsworth and Gordon Morrison. Yale University Press. ISBN 978-0-300-17154-9.
- Larridon, Isabel; Zuntini, Alexandre R.; Léveillé-Bourret, Étienne; Barrett, Russell L.; Starr, Julian R.; Muasya, A. Muthama; Villaverde, Tamara; Bauters, Kenneth; Brewer, Grace E.; Bruhl, Jeremy J.; Costa, Suzana M.; Elliott, Tammy L.; Epitawalage, Niroshini; Escudero, Marcial; Fairlie, Isabel; Goetghebeur, Paul; Hipp, Andrew L.; Jiménez-Mejías, Pedro; Kikuchi, Izai A.B. Sabino; Luceño, Modesto; Márquez-Corro, José Ignacio; Martín-Bravo, Santiago; Maurin, Olivier; Pokorny, Lisa; Roalson, Eric H.; Semmouri, Ilias; Simpson, David A.; Spalink, Daniel; Thomas, W. Wayt; Wilson, Karen L.; Xanthos, Martin; Forest, Félix; Baker, William J. (2021). "A new classification of Cyperaceae (Poales) supported by phylogenomic data". Journal of Systematics and Evolution. 59 (4): 852–895. Bibcode:2021JSyEv..59..852L. doi:10.1111/jse.12757. hdl:1854/LU-8709768.
- Léveillé-Bourret, Étienne (2018). Evolution and classification of the Cariceae-Dulichieae-Scirpeae Clade (Cyperaceae) (PhD). University of Ottawa.
- Linnaeus, Carl (1753). Species Plantarum: exhibentes plantas rite cognitas, ad genera relatas, cum differentiis specificis, nominibus trivialibus, synonymis selectis, locis natalibus, secundum systema sexuale digestas (1st ed.). Stockholm: Impensis Laurentii Salvii.
- Linnaeus, Carl (1754). Genera plantarum: eorumque characteres naturales secundum numerum, figuram, situm, et proportionem omnium fructificationis partium (in Latin). Holmiæ (Stockholm): Impensis Laurentii Salvii.
- Linnaeus, Carl (1762). Species Plantarum: exhibentes plantas rite cognitas, ad genera relatas, cum differentiis specificis, nominibus trivialibus, synonymis selectis, locis natalibus, secundum systema sexuale digestas (2nd ed.). Stockholm: Impensis Laurentii Salvii.
- Micheli, Pier Antonio (1729). Nova plantarum genera iuxta Tournefortii methodum disposita (in Latin). Florentiae: Typis Bernardi Paperinii.
- Novoselova, M. S. (1994a). "Sistema roda Eriophorum (Cyperaceae): 1. Podrody Erioscirpus, Eriophoropsis, Phyllanthela" [The system of the genus Eriophorum (Cyperaceae): 1. Subgenera Erioscirpus, Eriophoropsis, Phyllanthela]. Botanicheskii Zhurnal. 79 (11): 77–89.
- Novoselova, M. S. (1994b). "Sistema roda Eriophorum (Cyperaceae): 2. Podrod Eriophorum" [The system of the genus Eriophorum (Cyperaceae): 2. Subgenus Eriophorum]. Botanicheskii Zhurnal. 79 (12): 66–75.
- Raymond, Marcel (1954). "What is Eriophorum chamissonis C. A. Meyer?" (PDF). Svensk Bot. Tidskr. 48 (1): 65–82.
- Scopoli, Giovanni Antonio (1772). Flora Carniolica: exhibens plantas Carnioliae indigenas et distributas in classes, genera, species, varietates, ordine Linnaeano (2nd ed.). Vienna: Impensis Ioannis Pauli Krauss, bibliopolae Vindobonensis.
- Starr, Julian R.; Léveillé-Bourret, Étienne; Vu, Anh Tài; Nguyên, Thi Kim Thanh; Ford, Bruce A. (2019). "The rediscovery of the rare Vietnamese endemic Eriophorum scabriculme redefines generic limits in the Scirpo-Caricoid Clade (Cyperaceae)". PeerJ. 7:e7538 e7538. doi:10.7717/peerj.7538. PMC 6765354. PMID 31579569.
- Tucker, Gordon C.; Miller, Norton G. (1990). "Achene microstructure in Eriophorum L. (Cyperaceae): systematic implications and paleobotanical applications" (PDF). Bulletin of the Torrey Botanical Club. 117 (3): 266–283. doi:10.2307/2996695. JSTOR 2996695.
- Tournefort, Joseph Pitton de (1694). Éléments de botanique ou methode pour connaître les plantes (in French). Paris: Imprimerie Royale.
- Tournefort, Joseph Pitton de; Jussieu, Antoine de (1719). Josephi Pitton Tournefort Aquisextiensis, doctoris medici Parisiensis, Academiae regiae scientiarum socii, et in horto regio botanices professoris, Institutiones rei herbariae (in Latin). France: E typographia regia.
- Turland, Nicholas (1997). "Proposal to Reject the Name Eriophorum polystachion (Cyperaceae)". Taxon. 46 (1): 115–116. doi:10.2307/1224300. JSTOR 1224300.
