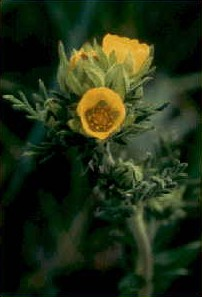

Scientific classification
- Kingdom: Plantae
- Clade: Tracheophytes
- Clade: Angiosperms
- Clade: Eudicots
- Clade: Rosids
- Order: Rosales
- Family: Rosaceae
- Genus: Potentilla
- Species: P. pensylvanica

Binomial name
- Potentilla pensylvanica L.

= Potentilla pensylvanica =

Species of flowering plant

Potentilla pensylvanica (P. pensylvanica) is a species of cinquefoil known by the common names Pennsylvania cinquefoil and prairie cinquefoil. In Shoshoni, it is known as Ku'-si-wañ-go-gǐp. It is native to much of northern and western North America, including most of Canada and the western half of the United States. P. pensylvanica grows in many types of habitat. The plant is quite variable in appearance; it can be small and tuft-like or slender and erect. The leaves are divided into leaflets which are deeply lobed and have hairy undersides. The inflorescence is a cluster of several flowers, each with five yellow petals a few millimeters in length. The flower is 3 to 5mm wide. P. pensylvanica grows in elevations between elevations 2700 to 3800 meters.

== Growth ==
Potentilla pensylvanica's bloom period lasts from July to August.
