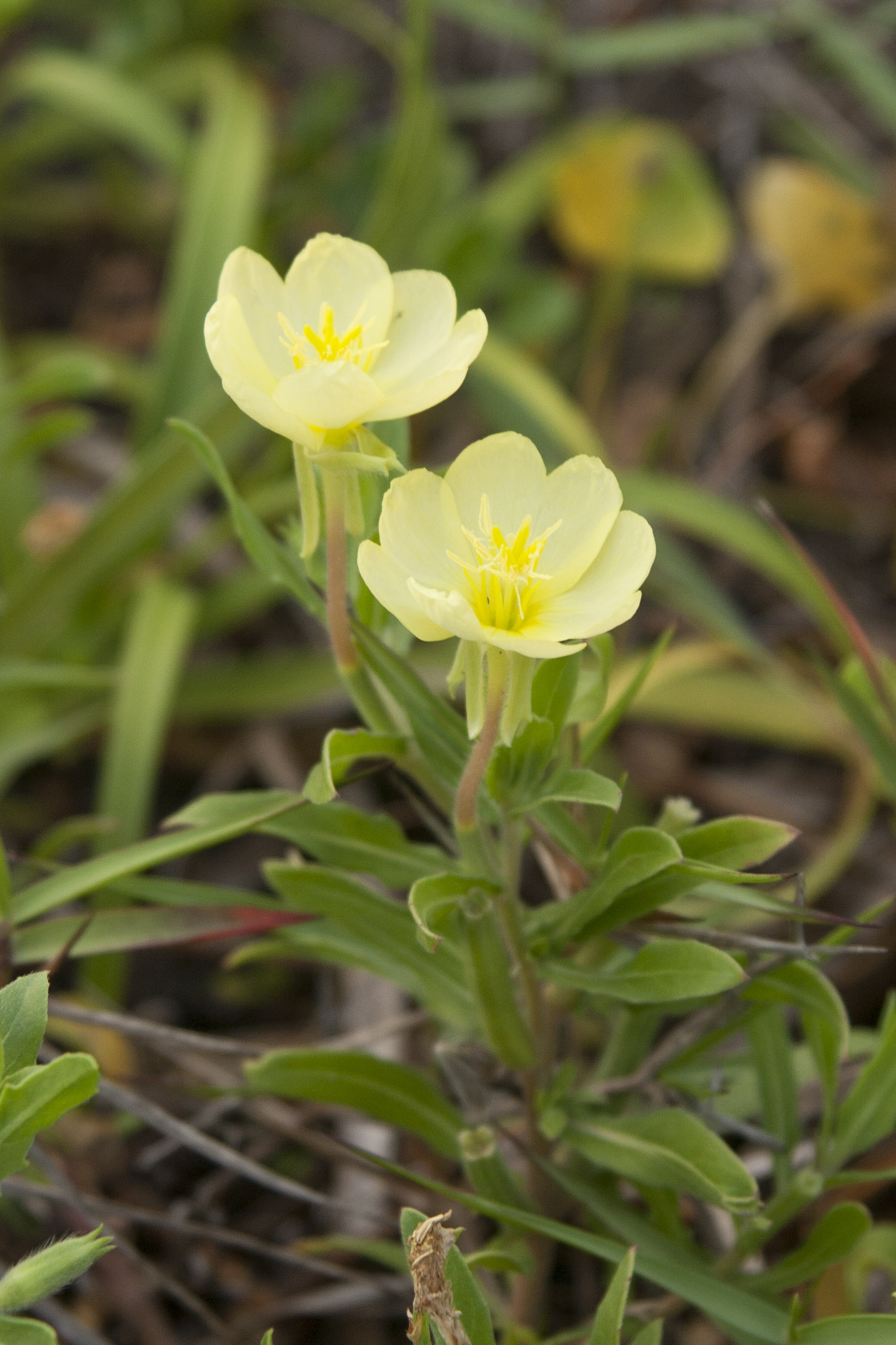

Scientific classification
- Kingdom: Plantae
- Clade: Embryophytes
- Clade: Tracheophytes
- Clade: Angiosperms
- Clade: Eudicots
- Clade: Rosids
- Order: Myrtales
- Family: Onagraceae
- Genus: Oenothera
- Species: O. laciniata

Binomial name
- Oenothera laciniata Hill

= Oenothera laciniata =

Species of flowering plant

Oenothera laciniata is a species of flowering plant in the evening primrose family known by the common name cutleaf evening primrose. It is native to the eastern United States but it can be found in many other places as an introduced species and sometimes a noxious weed. It has been reported in Hawaii, Australia, Britain, France, Korea, Japan, and other areas.

== Description ==
This is an annual or short-lived perennial herb producing a spreading stem from a hairy rosette of deeply cut or lobed leaves. On the stem, the leaves are alternately arranged. It has fibrous roots from a taproot. Flowers occur in the axils of leaves higher on the stem. Each flower has pale to deep yellow petals up to about 2 centimeters long which fade orange, pink, or red with age. The fruit is a cylindrical capsule up to 5 centimeters in length and the seeds are deeply pitted. O. laciniata leaves range from oblanceolate to elliptic in shape, and may be irregularly lobed or pinnatifid.

== Habitat and distribution ==
O. laciniata's range stretches from Maine to North Dakota, and extends south to Florida and Texas. Additionally, populations have been reported in California.

Within the southeastern United States' coastal plain, this species can be found in habitat types such as pine flatwoods, pine savannas, and shrub bogs.
