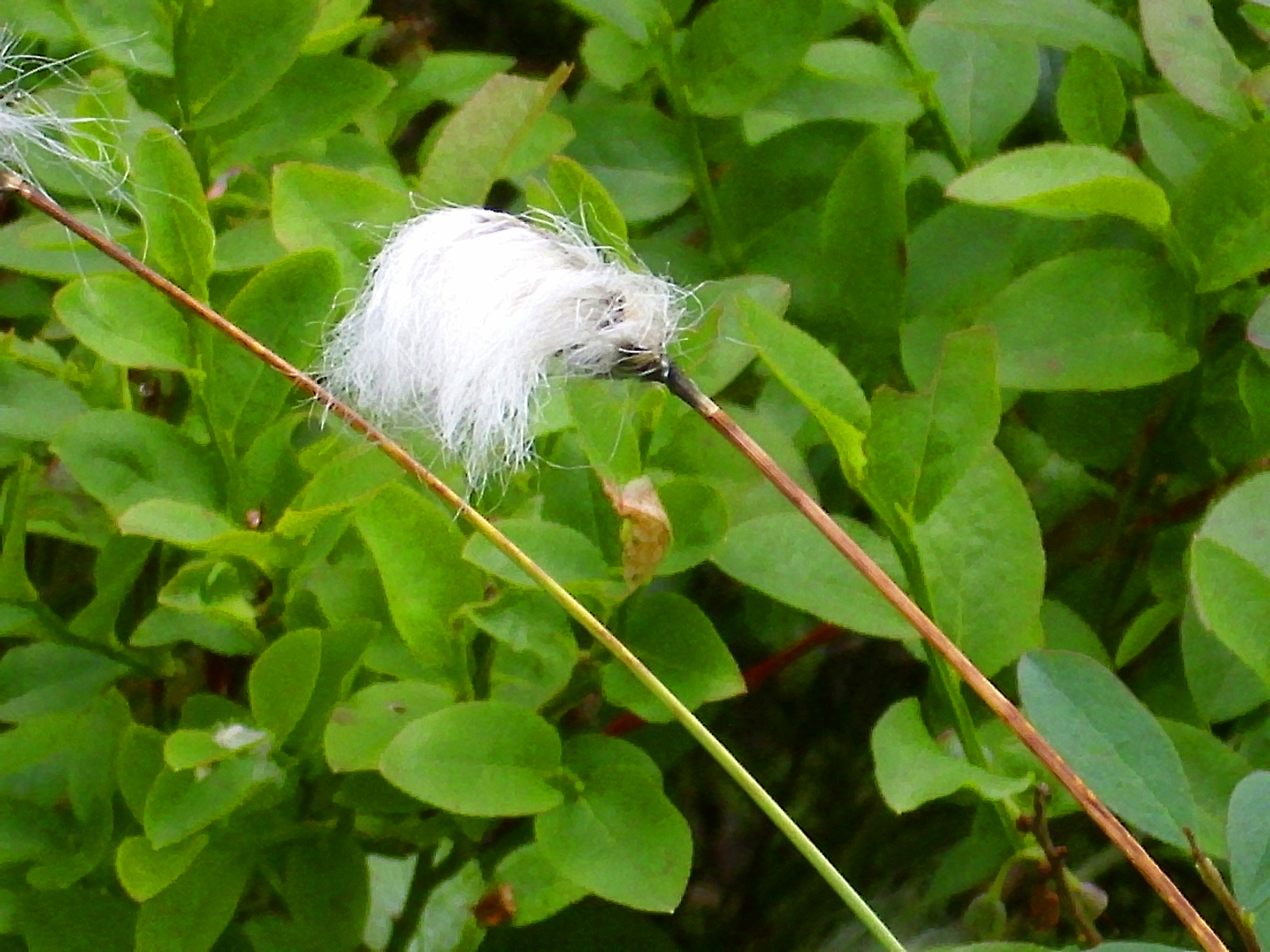

Scientific classification
- Kingdom: Plantae
- Clade: Tracheophytes
- Clade: Angiosperms
- Clade: Monocots
- Clade: Commelinids
- Order: Poales
- Family: Cyperaceae
- Genus: Eriophorum
- Species: E. chamissonis

Binomial name
- Eriophorum chamissonis C.A.Mey.

Synonyms
- Eriophorum russeolum Fr.

= Eriophorum chamissonis =

Species of grass-like plant

Eriophorum chamissonis is a species of flowering plant belonging to the family Cyperaceae.

== Distribution and habitat ==
The native range of Eriophorum chamissonis is Subarctic to Western Central USA.

== Bibliography ==
- Raymond, Marcel (1954). "What is Eriophorum chamissonis C. A. Meyer?" (PDF). Svensk Bot. Tidskr. 48 (1): 65–82.
- Aiken, S.G.; Dallwitz, M.J.; Consaul, L.L.; McJannet, C.L.; Boles, R.L.; Argus, G.W.; Gillett, J.M.; Scott, P.J.; Elven, R.; LeBlanc, M.C.; Gillespie, L.J.; Brysting, A.K.; Solstad, H.; Harris, J.G., "Eriophorum russeolum Fr. ex Hartm. subsp. leiocarpum Novoselova", Flora of the Canadian Arctic Archipelago: Descriptions, Illustrations, Identification, and Information Retrieval, Ottawa: NRC Research Press, National Research Council of Canada
- Cayouette, Jacques (2004). "A taxonomic review of the Eriophorum russeolum—E. scheuchzeri complex (Cyperaceae) in North America". SIDA, Contributions to Botany. 21 (2): 791–814.
