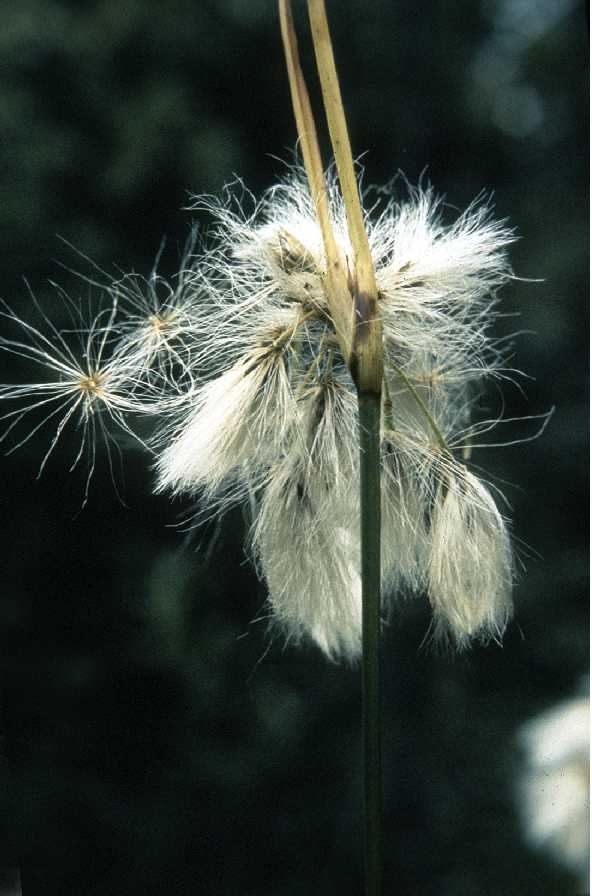

Conservation status
- Secure (NatureServe)

Scientific classification
- Kingdom: Plantae
- Clade: Embryophytes
- Clade: Tracheophytes
- Clade: Angiosperms
- Clade: Monocots
- Clade: Commelinids
- Order: Poales
- Family: Cyperaceae
- Genus: Eriophorum
- Species: E. viridicarinatum

Binomial name
- Eriophorum viridicarinatum (Engelm.) Fernald

Synonyms
- Eriophorum latifolium var. viridicarinatum Engelm.

= Eriophorum viridicarinatum =

Species of flowering plant in the sedge family

Eriophorum viridicarinatum is a species of sedge known by the common names thinleaf cottonsedge, green-keeled cottongrass, and bog cottongrass. It is native to Canada and the United States.

== Description ==
Eriophorum viridicarinatum is a perennial sedge that forms tufts of stiff, erect stems, sometimes just a single stem, and basal leaves up to 30 centimeters (12 in) long. It grows from a rhizome. The inflorescence is accompanied by two to four leaflike bracts each a few centimeters long. There are up to 30 spikelets, increasing in size as the fruit develops, reaching 3 centimeters in length. Each flower has a tuft of white or brown bristles that are long and cottony, measuring up to 2.5 centimeters long.

== Taxonomy ==
Eriophorum viridicarinatum was first described as the variety Eriophorum latifolium var. viridicarinatum by the German-American botanist Georg Engelmann in 1844. Engelmann's description was based on specimens collected in Massachusetts and Ohio. (The name published by Engelmann was hyphenated, as in viridi-carinatum, but the orthographical variant viridicarinatum is now widely used instead.) The American botanist Merritt Lyndon Fernald raised the variety to species rank in 1905. As of September 2024, Eriophorum viridicarinatum (Engelm.) Fernald is a widely accepted name.

== Distribution and habitat ==
Eriophorum viridicarinatum is native to northern North America, where it occurs in Alaska and throughout much of Canada, its range extending into the northern contiguous United States. It is widespread in eastern Canada, with spotty distribution in western Canada and Alaska. In the United States, it is most common in western Montana, the Great Lakes region, and New England.

Eriophorum viridicarinatum is an obligate wetland (OBL) species. Throughout its range, it occurs in marshes, wet meadows, bogs, fens, and wet woodlands, at altitudes up to 6,600 feet (2,000 m). In the Pacific Northwest, British Columbia, Montana, and Wyoming, it typically occurs in montane and alpine zones. In New England, it prefers fens and high-pH meadows. It is a strict calciphile in Michigan, Pennsylvania, and Vermont, but its habitat broadens further north into Canada.

== Bibliography ==
- Engelmann, George (1844). "Catalogue of a collection of plants made in Illinois and Missouri, by Charles A. Geyer". Am. J. Sci. Arts. 46: 94–104.
- Fernald, M. L. (May 1905). "The North American species of Eriophorum. Part 1: Synopsis of American species". Rhodora. 7 (77): 81–92.
- Gilman, Arthur V. (2015). New Flora of Vermont. Memoirs of The New York Botanical Garden, Volume 110. Bronx, New York, USA: The New York Botanical Garden Press. ISBN 978-0-89327-516-7.
- Haines, Arthur (2011). New England Wild Flower Society's Flora Novae Angliae: A Manual for the Identification of Native and Naturalized Higher Vascular Plants of New England. Illustrated by Elizabeth Farnsworth and Gordon Morrison. Yale University Press. ISBN 978-0-300-17154-9.
- Lichvar, R.W.; Banks, D.L.; Kirchner, W.N.; Melvin, N.C. (28 April 2016). "The National Wetland Plant List: 2016 wetland ratings" (PDF). Phytoneuron. 2016–30: 1–17. ISSN 2153-733X.
- McPherson, J. I. (2013). "Conservation Assessment of Calcareous Ecosystems" (PDF). Pittsburgh, PA: Pennsylvania Natural Heritage Program at Western Pennsylvania Conservancy.
