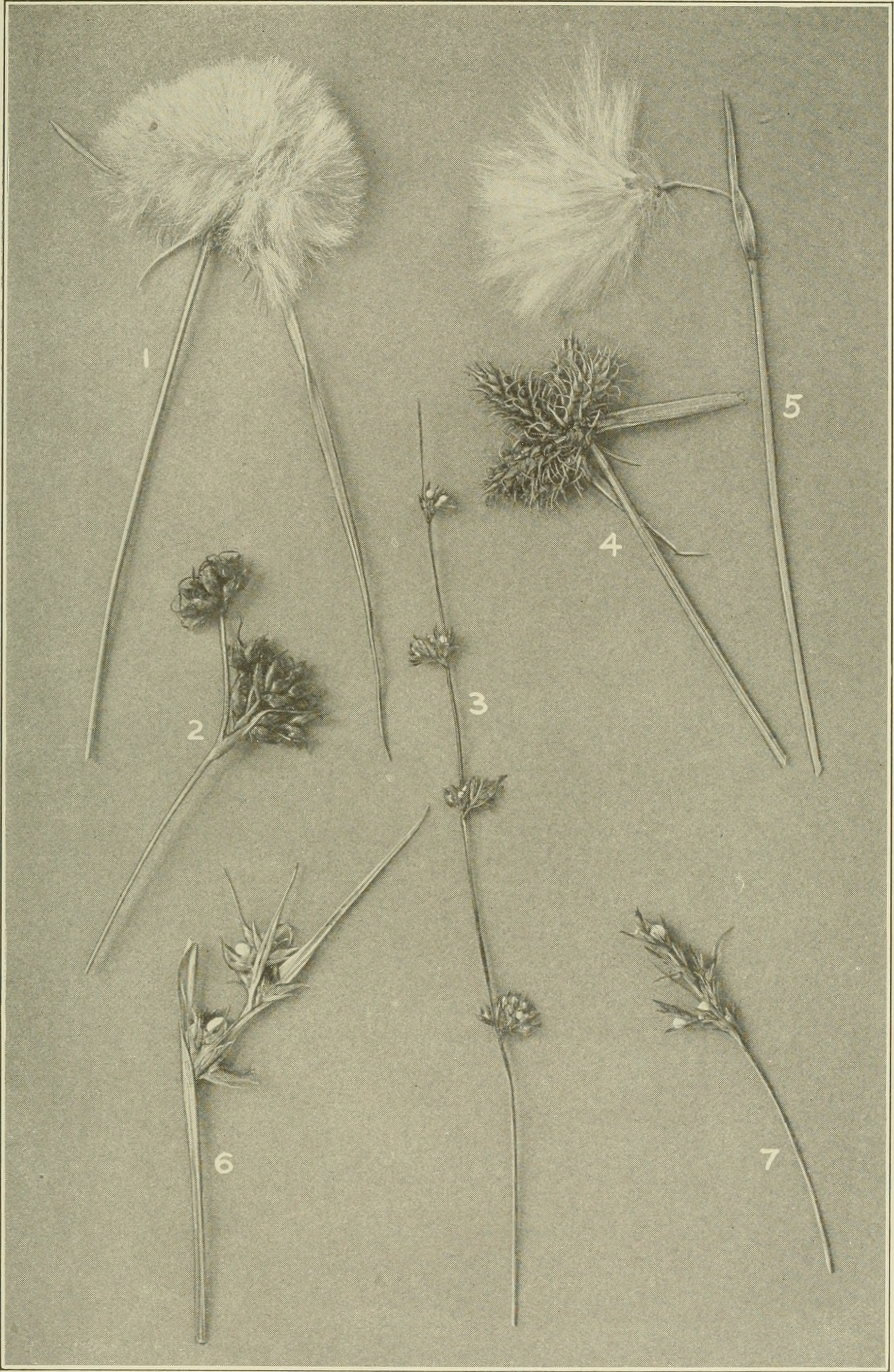
- No. 5: Eriophorum tenellum

Conservation status
- Secure (NatureServe)

Scientific classification
- Kingdom: Plantae
- Clade: Embryophytes
- Clade: Tracheophytes
- Clade: Spermatophytes
- Clade: Angiosperms
- Clade: Monocots
- Clade: Commelinids
- Order: Poales
- Family: Cyperaceae
- Genus: Eriophorum
- Species: E. tenellum

Binomial name
- Eriophorum tenellum Nutt.

= Eriophorum tenellum =

Species of flowering plant

Eriophorum tenellum is a species of flowering plant in the sedge family Cyperaceae.

== Description ==
Eriophorum tenellum is a perennial herbaceous plant that spreads by means of underground rhizomes.

== Taxonomy ==
Eriophorum tenellum was first described by the English botanist and zoologist Thomas Nuttall in 1818.

== Distribution and habitat ==
Eriophorum tenellum is native to eastern North America, from Nunavut in Canada to Pennsylvania in the United States (U.S.), ranging as far west as Minnesota. In the U.S., it is most common in New England and the upper Great Lakes region.

Eriophorum tenellum is an obligate wetland (OBL) species. In New England, it prefers bogs, fens, and meadows.

== Ecology ==
Eriophorum tenellum is a perennial flowering plant that flowers in June. After the flowers are pollinated, cotton-like fruiting heads develop during the summer. For example, fruiting occurs during July and August in Minnesota.

== Bibliography ==
- Gilman, Arthur V. (2015). New Flora of Vermont. Memoirs of The New York Botanical Garden, Volume 110. Bronx, New York, USA: The New York Botanical Garden Press. ISBN 978-0-89327-516-7.
- Gledhill, David (2008). The Names of Plants (4th ed.). Cambridge University Press. ISBN 978-0-521-86645-3.
- Haines, Arthur (2011). New England Wild Flower Society's Flora Novae Angliae: A Manual for the Identification of Native and Naturalized Higher Vascular Plants of New England. Illustrated by Elizabeth Farnsworth and Gordon Morrison. Yale University Press. ISBN 978-0-300-17154-9.
