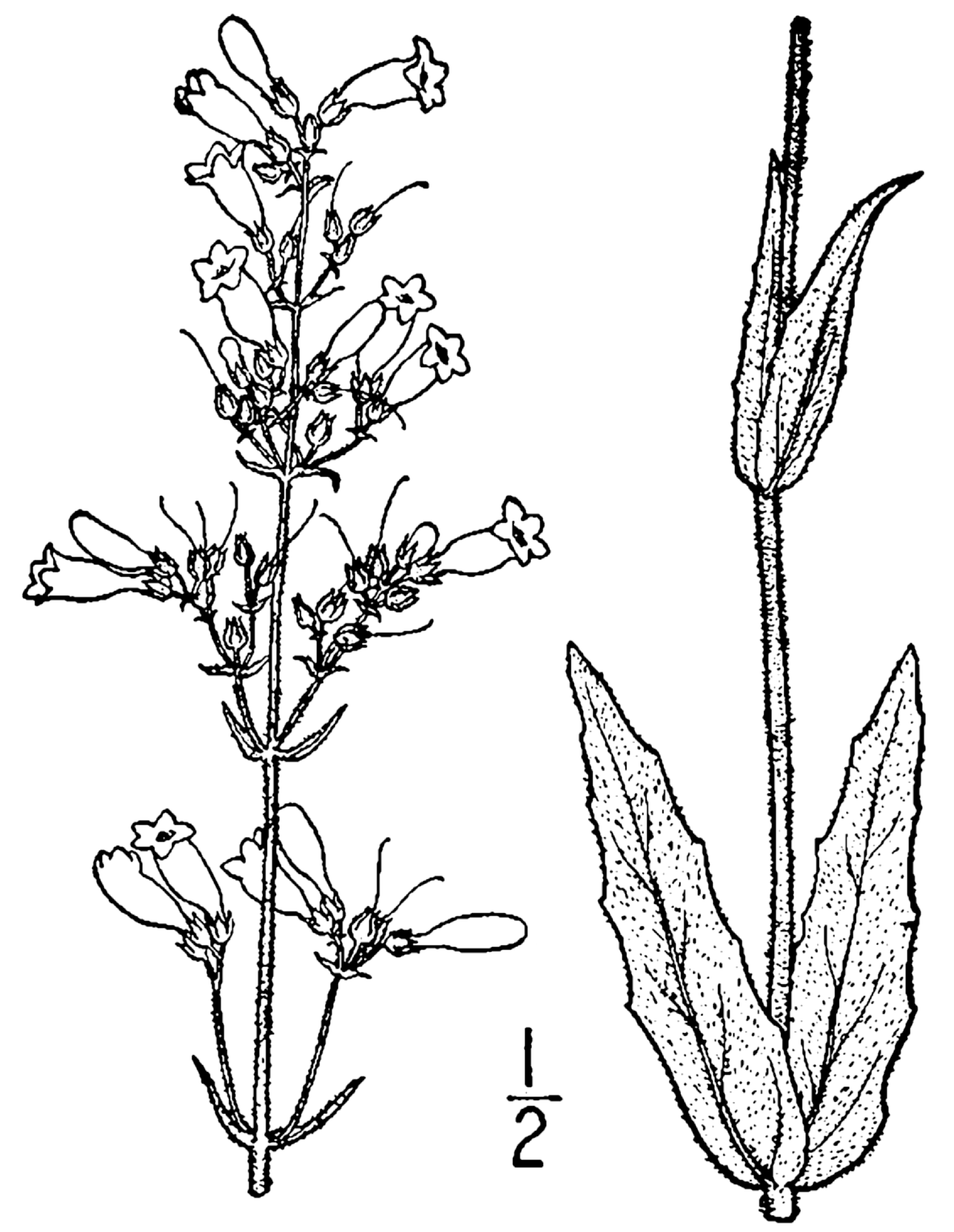

Conservation status
- Secure (NatureServe)

Scientific classification
- Kingdom: Plantae
- Clade: Tracheophytes
- Clade: Angiosperms
- Clade: Eudicots
- Clade: Asterids
- Order: Lamiales
- Family: Plantaginaceae
- Genus: Penstemon
- Species: P. pallidus

Binomial name
- Penstemon pallidus Small

= Penstemon pallidus =

Species of flowering plant

Penstemon pallidus, the pale beardtongue, is a flower native to the eastern United States. It has been introduced to Canada.
