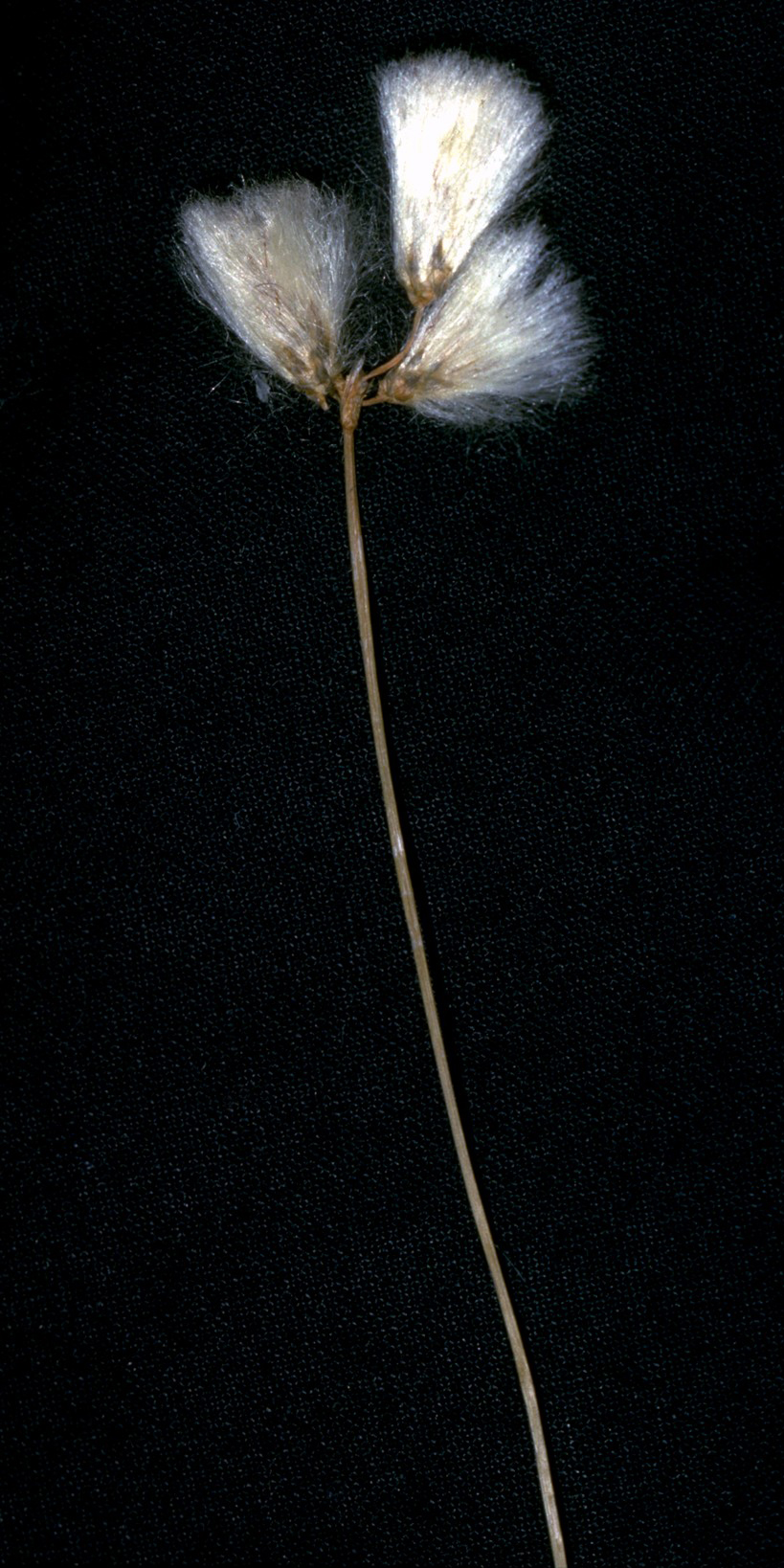

Scientific classification
- Kingdom: Plantae
- Clade: Embryophytes
- Clade: Tracheophytes
- Clade: Angiosperms
- Clade: Monocots
- Clade: Commelinids
- Order: Poales
- Family: Cyperaceae
- Genus: Eriophorum
- Species: E. gracile

Binomial name
- Eriophorum gracile Roth

= Eriophorum gracile =

Species of flowering plant in the sedge family

Eriophorum gracile is a species of flowering plant in the sedge family, Cyperaceae. It is known by the common name slender cottongrass, or slender cottonsedge. Eriophorum gracile is a plant with circumboreal distribution, extending south into mountain ranges of the Northern Hemisphere. It grows in wet areas such as bogs.

Eriophorum gracile is a thin, tall perennial herb with a slender, rounded, solid, mostly naked stem reaching 30 to 60 cm (12 to 24 in) in height. It produces a fluffy inflorescence atop its stem with a wispy, cottony white flower. The plants grow in colonies, often spreading vegetatively by rhizome.

== Bibliography ==
- Barr, Camille (1996). "Population Study of Eriophorum gracile Koch (Cyperaceae) at its Southern Range Limit in Pennsylvania". Bartonia. 59: 87–93.
