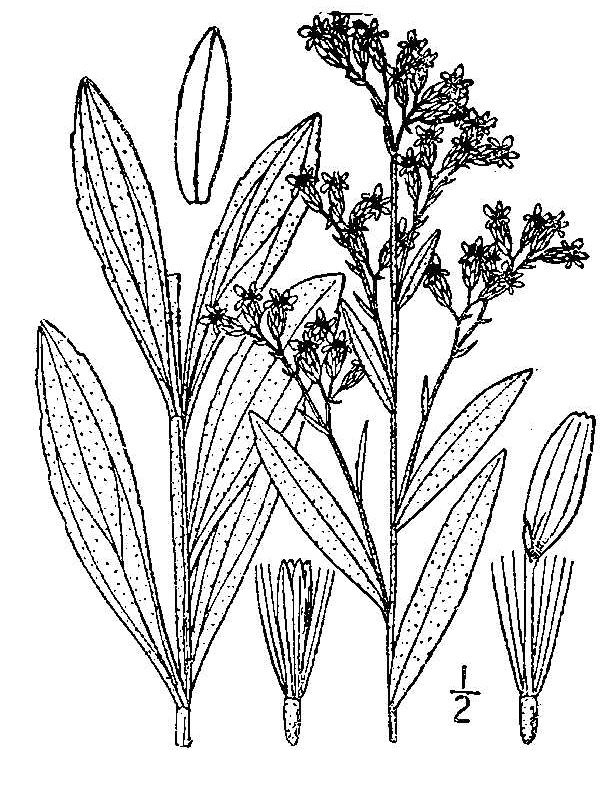
- 1913 illustration

Conservation status
- Secure (NatureServe)

Scientific classification
- Kingdom: Plantae
- Clade: Tracheophytes
- Clade: Angiosperms
- Clade: Eudicots
- Clade: Asterids
- Order: Asterales
- Family: Asteraceae
- Genus: Solidago
- Species: S. mollis

Binomial name
- Solidago mollis Bartl. July 1836 not Rothr. October 1836

Synonyms
- Synonymy: Doria incana Lunell; Doria mollis (Bartl.) Lunell; Solidago incana Torr. & A.Gray; Solidago mollis var. angustata Shinners; Solidago nemoralis var. incana (Torr. & A.Gray) A.Gray; Solidago nemoralis var. mollis (Bartl.) A.Gray

= Solidago mollis =

Species of flowering plant

Solidago mollis is a North American species of flowering plant in the family Asteraceae known by the common names velvety goldenrod, soft goldenrod or Ashly goldenrod. It is native to the central United States and central Canada, primarily the Great Plains from the Canadian Prairie Provinces south as far as Texas and New Mexico.

Solidago mollis is a perennial herb up to 70 cm (2.3 ft) tall with creeping rhizomes. Leaves are egg-shaped or lance shaped, up to 10 cm (4 in) long, covered with soft, fine hairs. One plant can produce as many as 300 small yellow flower heads in a branching array at the top of the plant.

== Galls ==
This species is host to the following insect induced gall:

- Asteromyia carbonifera (Osten Sacken, 1862)

external link to gallformers
