= Coralroot =

Coralroot is a common name for several plants which may refer to:

- Members of the orchid genus Corallorhiza
  - Corallorhiza maculata, spotted coralroot
  - Corallorhiza mertensiana, Pacific coralroot, Mertens' coralroot
  - Corallorhiza odontorhiza, fall coralroot, small-flowered coralroot
  - Corallorhiza striata, striped coralroot
  - Corallorhiza trifida, yellow coralroot
  - Corallorhiza wisteriana, spring coralroot
- Members of the orchid genus Hexalectris
  - Hexalectris arizonica, Arizona crested coralroot
  - Hexalectris colemanii, Coleman's crested coralroot
  - Hexalectris grandiflora, largeflower crested coralroot, giant coralroot
  - Hexalectris spicata, spiked crested coralroot
  - Hexalectris warnockii, Texas crested coralroot
- Cardamine bulbifera, in the bittercress genus Cardamine
