= Spiked crested coralroot =

Spiked crested coralroot is a common name for two plants which are sometimes considered to belong to the same species:

- Hexalectris arizonica
- Hexalectris spicata
