= Berge Virgin Forest Nature Reserve =

Nature reserve in Sweden

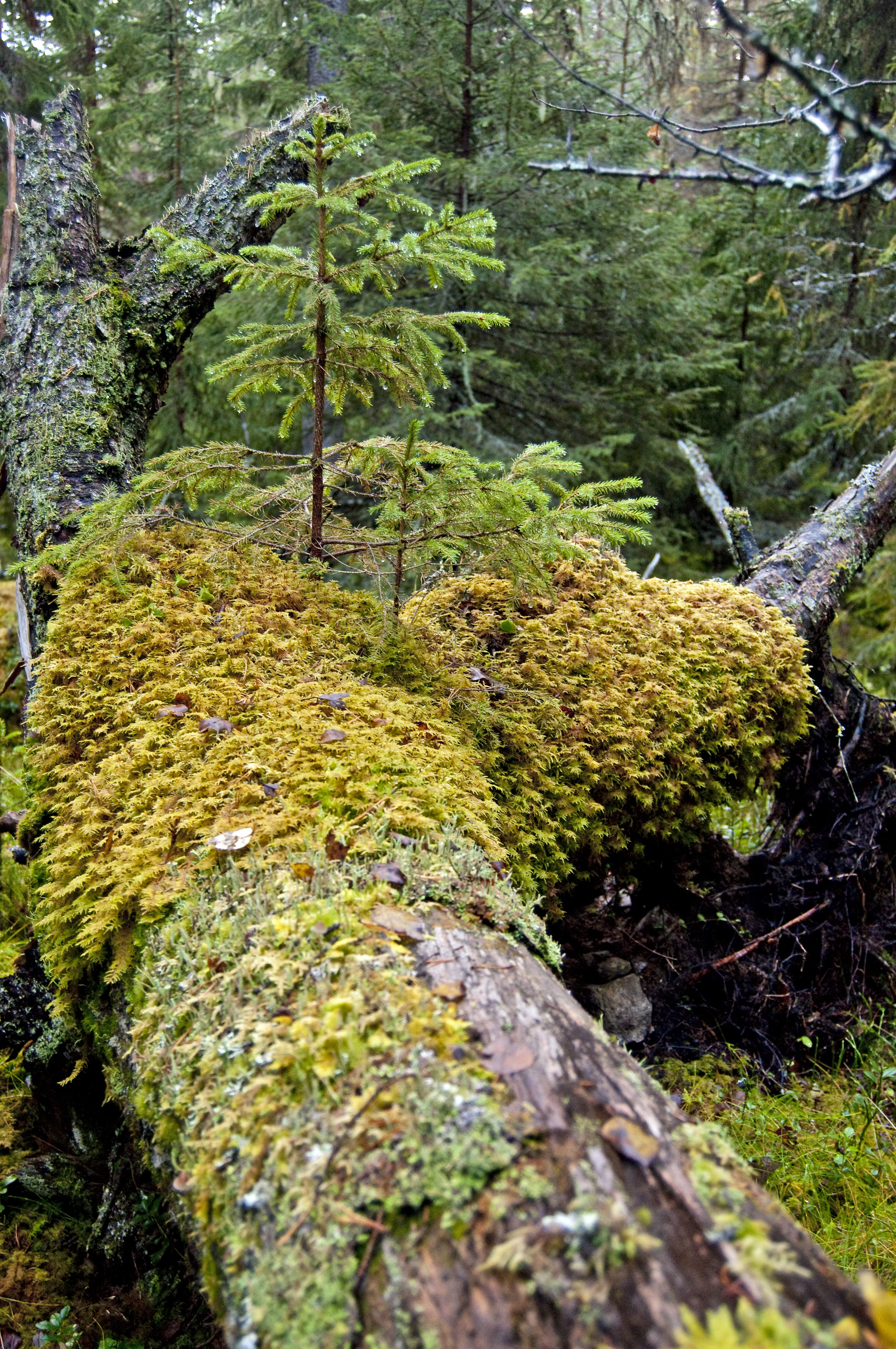

- Location within Jämtland Location within Sweden
- Location: Sweden
- Nearest city: Östersund
- Coordinates: 62°55′N 14°50′E
- Area: 0.7 km^{2} (170 acres)
- Established: 1998

Berge Virgin Forest Nature Reserve (Swedish: Berge urskogs naturreservat) is a nature reserve in Jämtland County in Sweden. It is part of the EU-wide Natura 2000-network.

The nature reserve protects an area of virgin forest in a hilly landscape, and also contains the Lake Gråssjön. Some parts of the forest is almost completely unaltered by human activity; for example, one tree in the nature reserve has been found to be 580 years old. The forest is mixed coniferous, and contains a lot of coarse woody debris. The unspoilt area is an important habitat for several unusual species, including lesser twayblade, heath spotted orchid and northern coralroot. It is also a preferred habitat for several birds, like osprey, red-throated loon and Eurasian three-toed woodpecker; the latter two are on the national Swedish red list.
