= Corallorhiza ekmanii =

Scientific classification
- Kingdom: Plantae
- Clade: Embryophytes
- Clade: Tracheophytes
- Clade: Spermatophytes
- Clade: Angiosperms
- Clade: Monocots
- Order: Asparagales
- Family: Orchidaceae
- Subfamily: Epidendroideae
- Genus: Corallorhiza
- Species: C. ekmanii

Binomial name
- Corallorhiza ekmanii Mansf.

Species of orchid

Corallorhiza ekmanii is a rare, leafless orchid native only to the island of Hispaniola, where it occurs in both Haiti and the Dominican Republic.

It is one of few orchids to have completely abandoned photosynthesis, lacking chlorophyll and depending entirely on subterranean fungal partners for nutrition—a condition known as holomycotrophy. Living concealed beneath dense forest canopy, it remains hidden for most of the year, revealing itself only when it emerges briefly from the leaf litter to flower.

== Distribution ==
C. ekmanii is endemic to the island of Hispaniola, occurring in both the Dominican Republic and Haiti. It can be found in certain high-elevation cloud forests (Hispaniolan moist forests) and pine forests (Hispaniolan pine forests) where undisturbed conditions and rich organic soils support the stable mycorrhizal networks essential to its survival

== Description ==
The plant grows from a branched, coral-like rhizome—a trait that gives its genus, Corallorhiza, its name. From this subterranean network, it sends up a smooth, often bulbous stem sheathed in a few sharp-tipped bracts. Where one might expect leaves, there are instead a few translucent, ovate leaflets—pale ghosts of foliage—dentate and paper-thin. These structures lack any photosynthetic capacity and serve no nutritive function.

Plants produce terminal, upright inflorescence bearing up to a dozen small, resupinate flowers. These are each accompanied by sharply pointed bracts that are shorter than the ovary. Flowering occurs without any foliage—an adaptation made possible by its total reliance on subterranean fungal partners for nutrients.
