= Corallorhiza mertensiana =

Pacific coralroot

Scientific classification
- Kingdom: Plantae
- Clade: Embryophytes
- Clade: Tracheophytes
- Clade: Spermatophytes
- Clade: Angiosperms
- Clade: Monocots
- Order: Asparagales
- Family: Orchidaceae
- Subfamily: Epidendroideae
- Genus: Corallorhiza
- Species: C. mertensiana

Binomial name
- Corallorhiza mertensiana Bong.

Synonyms
- Neottia mertensiana (Bong.) Kuntze; Corallorhiza maculata subsp. mertensiana (Bong.) Calder & Roy L.Taylor; Corallorhiza vancouveriana Finet; Corallorhiza purpurea L.O.Williams; Corallorhiza mertensiana f. albolabia P.M.Br.; Corallorhiza mertensiana f. pallida P.M.Br.

Species of orchid

Corallorhiza mertensiana, or Pacific coralroot, is a coralroot orchid native to the shady conifer forests of northwestern North America. It also goes by the common names Western coralroot and Mertens' coralroot. Corallorhiza mertensiana was previously considered a subspecies of Corallorhiza maculata but was given species rank in 1997 by Freudenstein.

== Description ==
Corallorrhiza mertensiana is a leafless, parasitic, perennial orchid that is 6–20 inches (150–510 mm) tall. The stem is red to brownish purple. The upper petals are pink to reddish pink, with yellow to dark red veins. The lower petals are wider, dark pink to red, and have three deep red veins. Beneath the lower petal the spur is prominent. The flower spikes are visible from May to August. Corallorrhiza mertensiana has no roots, only hard, branched rhizomes that resemble coral.

== Fungal associations ==
Corallorrhiza mertensiana is a nonphotosynthetic, myco-heterotroph that receives its nutrition from ectomycorrhizal fungi. The fungi receive mineral nutrients and carbon symbiotically from trees. Corallorrhiza mertensiana parasitizes the carbon from the fungi. Corallorrhiza mertensiana only associates with mutually exclusive subsets of species from the Russulaceae. Corallorrhiza mertensiana never shares fungal species with Corallorrhiza maculata even when intermixed at the same growing site.

== Habitat and distribution ==
Corallorrhiza mertensiana grows in shady coniferous forests at low to mid-elevations. It prefers damp soil that is rich in humus, and receives dappled sunlight. Corallorrhiza mertensiana is found in the Cascades from Alaska to California, and the Rocky Mountains from Alberta to Wyoming. In a survey of the plants found in Glacier Bay, Alaska in 1923, Corallorhiza mertensiana was reported to be growing beneath the thickets of Alnus tenuifolia along with Petasites frigida, Aspidium, and Polystichum. In British Columbia it has been found to be associated with Gaultheria shallon, Hylocomium splendens, and Rhytidiadelphus loreus.

== Gallery ==
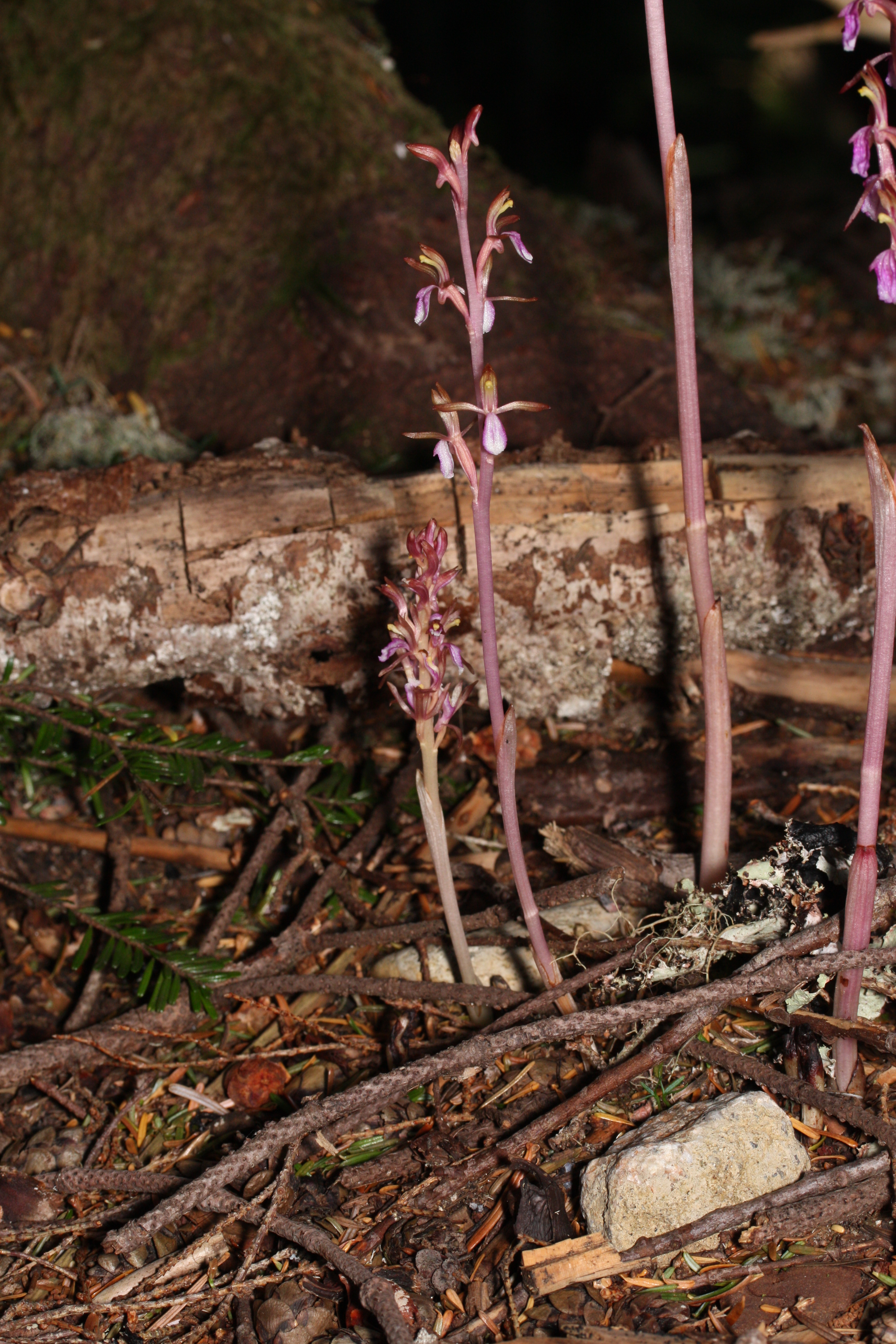
