= Hexalectris revoluta =

Scientific classification
- Kingdom: Plantae
- Clade: Tracheophytes
- Clade: Angiosperms
- Clade: Monocots
- Order: Asparagales
- Family: Orchidaceae
- Subfamily: Epidendroideae
- Genus: Hexalectris
- Species: H. revoluta

Binomial name
- Hexalectris revoluta Correll

Species of orchid

Hexalectris revoluta, the Chisos Mountain crested coralroot, is a terrestrial, myco-heterotrophic orchid lacking chlorophyll and subsisting entirely on nutrients obtained from mycorrhizal fungi in the soil. It is closely related to H. colemanii; the two are regarded by some authors as varieties of the same species. Hexalectris revoluta is native to western Texas, southeastern New Mexico and Chihuahua.
