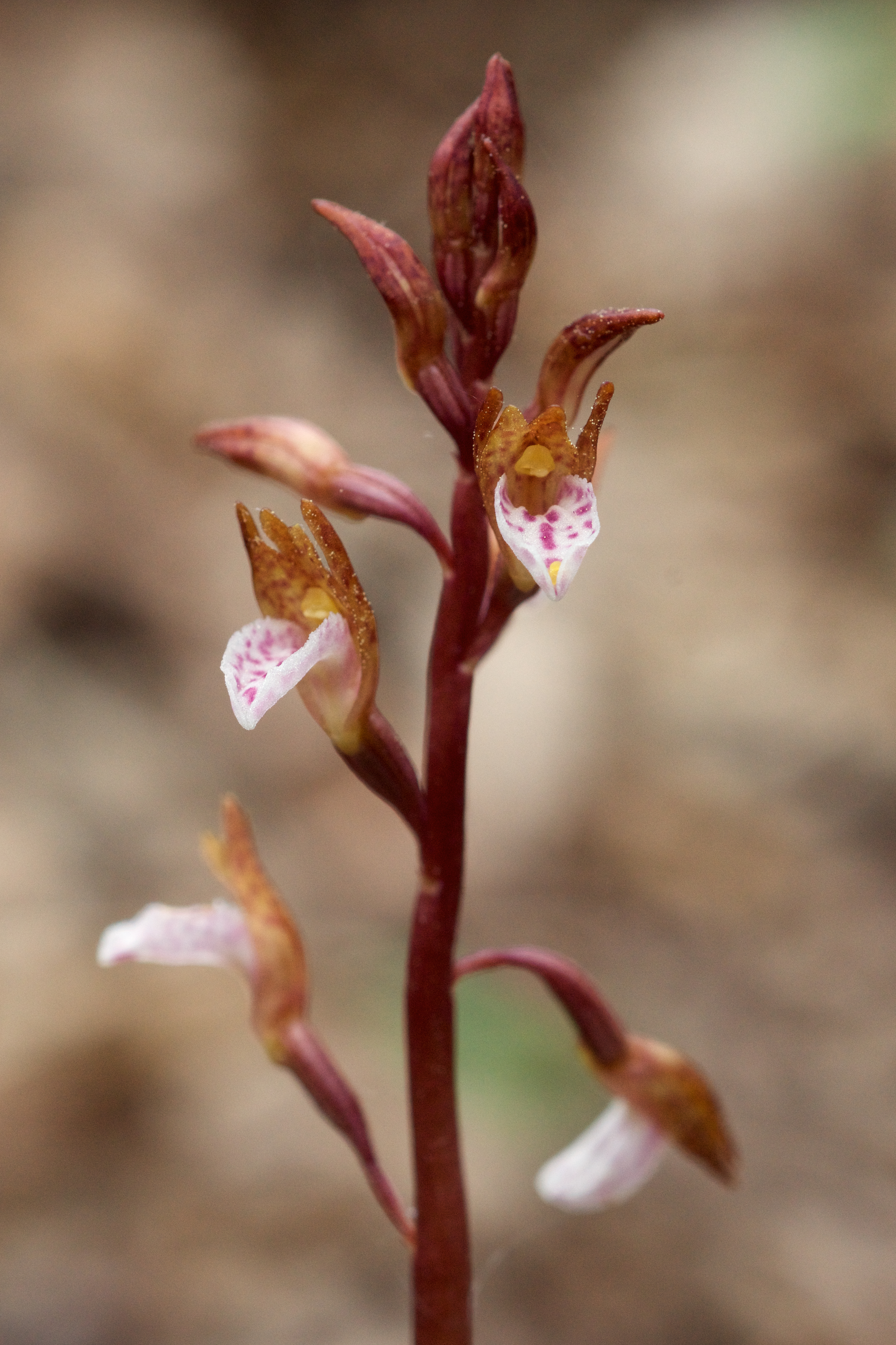

Conservation status
- Secure (NatureServe)

Scientific classification
- Kingdom: Plantae
- Clade: Tracheophytes
- Clade: Angiosperms
- Clade: Monocots
- Order: Asparagales
- Family: Orchidaceae
- Subfamily: Epidendroideae
- Genus: Corallorhiza
- Species: C. wisteriana

Binomial name
- Corallorhiza wisteriana Conrad

Synonyms
- List: Corallorhiza elliptica Schltr.; Corallorhiza fimbriata Schltr.; Corallorhiza hortensis Suksd.; Corallorhiza punctata A.Rich. & Galeotti; Neottia punctata (A.Rich. & Galeotti) Kuntze

= Corallorhiza wisteriana =

North American orchid species

Corallorhiza wisteriana, the spring coralroot or Wister's coralroot, is a species of coralroot orchid. It is widespread through much of Mexico as well as parts of the United States (Rocky Mountains, Appalachians, the Southeast, and the Mississippi and Ohio Valleys).

Spring coralroot blooms as early as December in Florida through early spring in other parts of the country. The flowers generally only last a few hours.

This plant prefers leaf litter in woodland areas and is mycotrophic.

== Description ==
The stems are the inflorescence of the plant and range in height between 10 and 55 centimeters (4 and 22 in) and do not have a thickened base. They can range in color between red-purple, yellowish-brown, and yellow. They are racemes, an unbranched stem of flowers with the oldest flowers closer to the base, and can be densely or sparsely covered in blooms. Each stem will have as few as 2 or as many as 25 flowers. The stem never has any leaves, but each flower has a small bract under where its attaches.

== Taxonomy ==
Corallorhiza wisteriana was scientifically described and named in 1829 by Solomon White Conrad (1779-1831). It is classified as a member of Corallorhiza, a genus in the Orchidaceae family. It has no accepted subspecies or forms, but it has 7 heterotypic synonyms.

Table of Synonyms
Name	Year	Rank
Corallorhiza elliptica Schltr.	1918	species
Corallorhiza fimbriata Schltr.	1925	species
Corallorhiza hortensis Suksd.	1927	species
Corallorhiza punctata A.Rich. & Galeotti	1845	species
Corallorhiza wisteriana f. albolabia P.M.Br.	1995	form
Corallorhiza wisteriana f. cooperi P.M.Br.	2004	form
Neottia punctata (A.Rich. & Galeotti) Kuntze	1891	species

=== Names ===
The species name was selected to honor American botanist Charles Wister. Corallorhiza wisteriana is known by the common name spring coralroot and Wister’s coral-root.

== Range and habitat ==
Spring coralroot is native to a wide area of North America from southern Mexico to Montana in the United States. In Mexico it can be found in the southeastern state of Chiapas and the southwestern states of Colima, Jalisco, Michoacán, and Oaxaca. In central Mexico it grow in the capital Ciudad de Mexico, the State of Mexico, Morelos, and Tlaxcala. To the northeast it is part of the flora of Coahuila, Chihuahua, Hidalgo, and Nuevo León, but is only found in Baja California Sur and Sonora in the northwest.

In the western United States it has been recorded in widely scattered counties along the Rocky Mountains from New Mexico and Arizona to Idaho and Wyoming. The USDA Natural Resources Conservation Service only shows it in Phillips County, Montana and also reports it being found in Jackson County, Oregon. The Flora of North America does not show it as native to Oregon, but does report it in Washington State without a specific location. It is recorded in four counties in western South Dakota. In Nebraska it grows in two counties, but at opposite ends of the state with the southeastern portion being part of the species range south to eastern Texas and in every state eastward. It grows as far north as New Jersey and Pennsylvania in the eastern US. It may be found from sea level all the way to 3,100 meters (10,200 ft) in elevation.

This orchid grows in both deciduous and coniferous woods, but it frequently prefers richer habitats than other coralroots.

== Ecology ==
In Florida this species gets its nutrients mainly from the ectomycorrhizal fungi Russula amoenolens and Russula pectinatoides. In the Mexico and the western United States they associate with fungi in the family Thelephoraceae.
