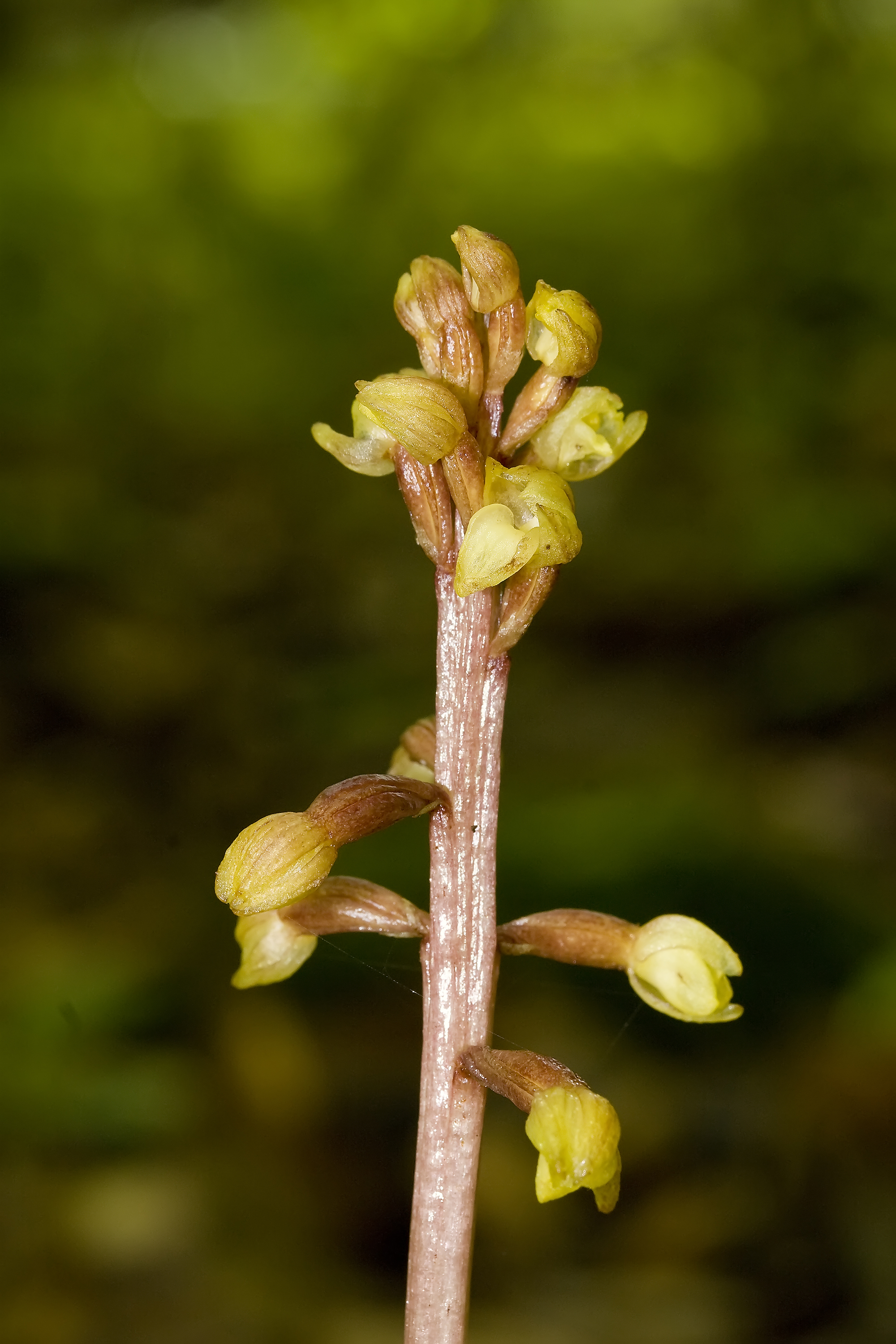

Scientific classification
- Kingdom: Plantae
- Clade: Tracheophytes
- Clade: Angiosperms
- Clade: Monocots
- Order: Asparagales
- Family: Orchidaceae
- Subfamily: Epidendroideae
- Genus: Corallorhiza
- Species: C. bentleyi

Binomial name
- Corallorhiza bentleyi Freudenstein

= Corallorhiza bentleyi =

Species of orchid

Corallorhiza bentleyi is a rare species of orchid known to grow solely in mountainous deciduous forests of Virginia and West Virginia, United States. It was undescribed until 1999.

It is a parasitic plant, with yellow to reddish stems and cleistogamous flowers.
