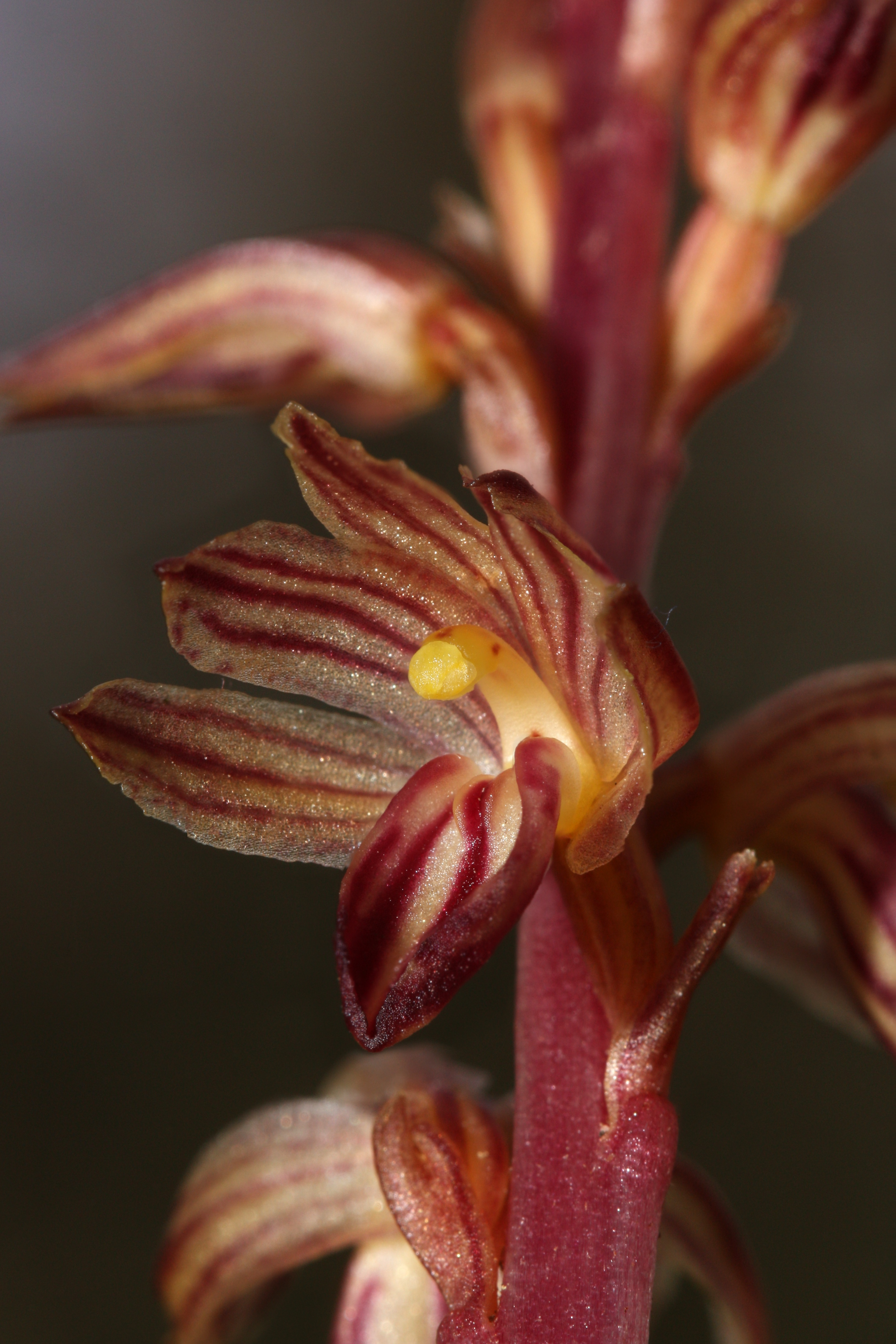
- Corallorhiza striata in the Columbia River Gorge

Conservation status
- Secure (NatureServe)

Scientific classification
- Kingdom: Plantae
- Clade: Tracheophytes
- Clade: Angiosperms
- Clade: Monocots
- Order: Asparagales
- Family: Orchidaceae
- Subfamily: Epidendroideae
- Genus: Corallorhiza
- Species: C. striata

Binomial name
- Corallorhiza striata Lindl.

Varieties
- C. s. var. involuta; C. s. var. striata; C. s. var. vreelandii

Synonyms
- Neottia striata

= Corallorhiza striata =

North American orchid species

Corallorhiza striata is a species of orchid known by the common names striped coralroot and hooded coralroot. This flowering plant is widespread across much of southern Canada, the northern and western United States, and Mexico. It lives in dry, decaying plant matter on the ground in pine and mixed coniferous forests, and it obtains its nutrients from fungi via mycoheterotrophy.

== Description ==
Like other coralroot orchids, the plant takes its name from its coral-shaped rhizomes. It has an erect stem about 15 to 50 cm (6 to 20 in) tall that may be red, pink, purple, or yellow-green to almost white. The leaves lack chlorophyll and are reduced to colourless scales that sheath the stem. The plant also lacks roots, and relies upon parasitism of fungi for sustenance.

The stem is topped by a raceme of 15 to 25 orchid flowers. Each flower is an open array of sepals and similar-looking petals that may be pink or yellowish and have darker pink or maroon stripes. Inside the flower is a column formed from the fusion of male and female parts, which may be spotted with purple or red. The fruit is a capsule one or two centimeters long.

== Taxonomy ==
Corallorhiza striata was scientifically named and described in 18440 by John Lindley. It is classified as part of the genus Corallorhiza within the Orchidaceae family. It has three accepted varieties according to Plants of the World Online:

- Corallorhiza striata var. involuta (Greenm.) Freudenst.
- Corallorhiza striata var. striata
- Corallorhiza striata var. vreelandii (Rydb.) L.O.Williams

Corallorhiza striata has 13 synonyms of the species or one of its three varieties including nine species names.

Table of Synonyms
Name	Year	Rank	Synonym of:	Notes
Corallorhiza bigelovii S.Watson	1877	species	var. vreelandii	= het.
Corallorhiza ehrenbergii Rchb.f.	1850	species	var. vreelandii	= het.
Corallorhiza involuta Greenm.	1898	species	var. involuta	≡ hom.
Corallorhiza macraei A.Gray	1856	species	var. striata	= het.
Corallorhiza ochroleuca Rydb.	1904	species	var. vreelandii	= het.
Corallorhiza striata f. eburnea P.M.Br.	1994	form	var. striata	= het.
Corallorhiza striata var. flavida T.A.Todsen & Todsen	1971	variety	var. striata	= het.
Corallorhiza striata f. flavida (T.A.Todsen & Todsen) P.M.Br.	1995	form	var. striata	= het.
Corallorhiza striata f. fulva Fernald	1946	form	var. vreelandii	= het.
Corallorhiza vreelandii Rydb.	1901	species	var. vreelandii	≡ hom.
Neottia bigelowii (S.Watson) Kuntze	1891	species	var. vreelandii	= het.
Neottia ehrenbergii (Rchb.f.) Kuntze	1891	species	var. vreelandii	= het.
Neottia striata (Lindl.) Kuntze	1891	species	C. maculata	≡ hom.
Notes: ≡ homotypic synonym; = heterotypic synonym

== Gallery ==
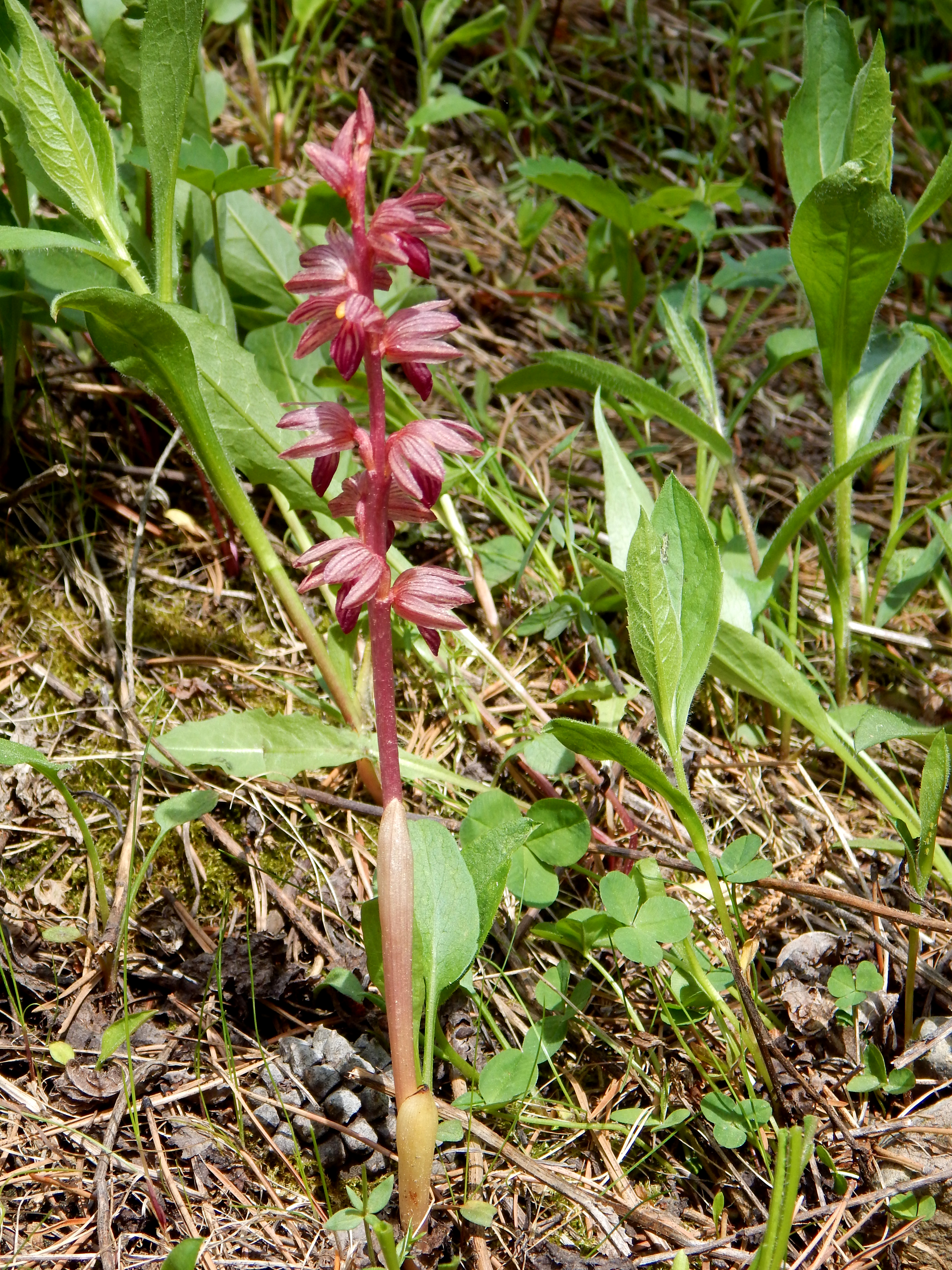
Corallorhiza striata near Barrier Lake, Alberta. Note the two pale leaves sheathing the lower part of the stem, and part of the coralloid rhizome showing on the left behind the base of the stem.

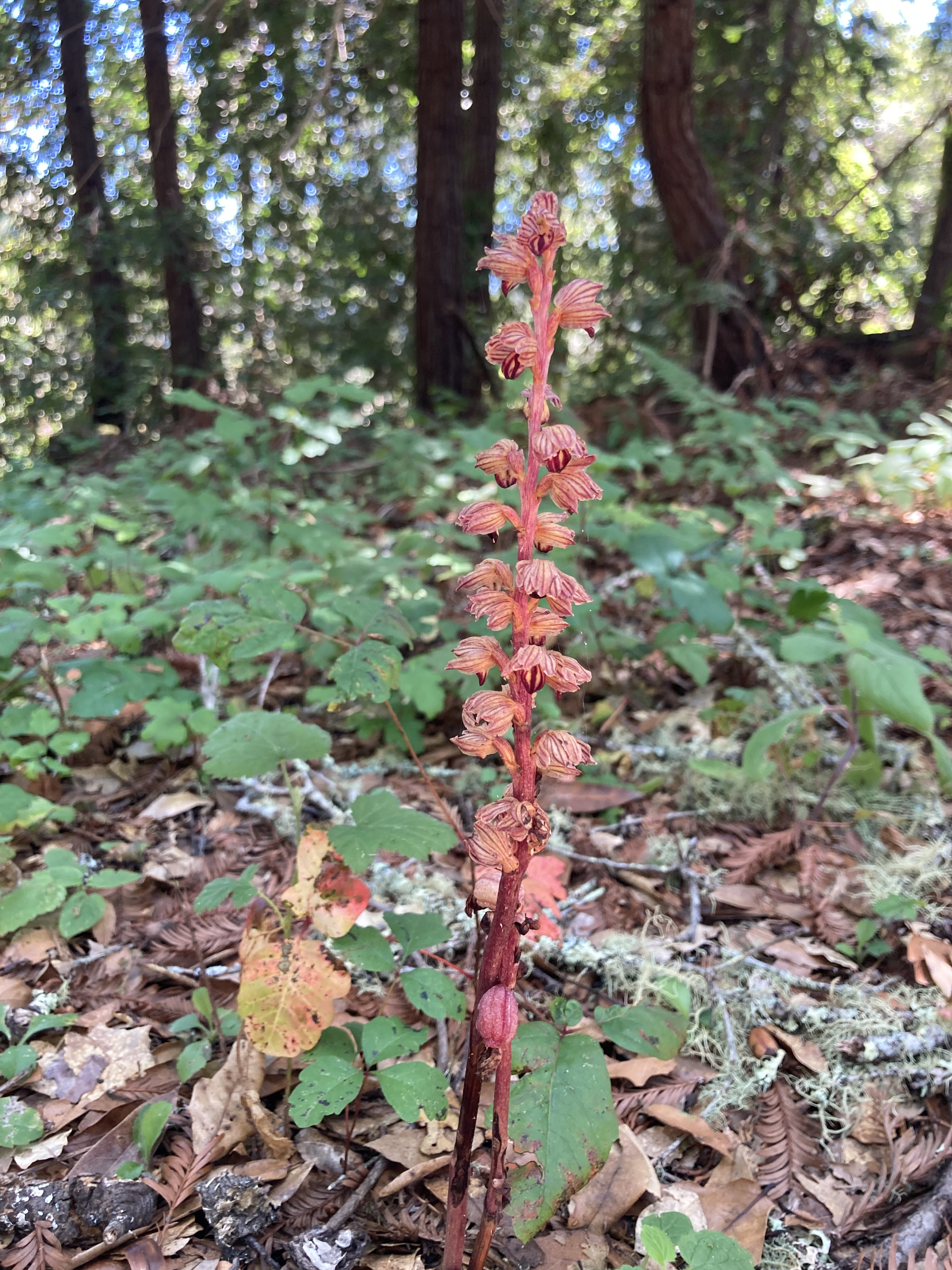
The orchid at Forest of Nisene Marks park.

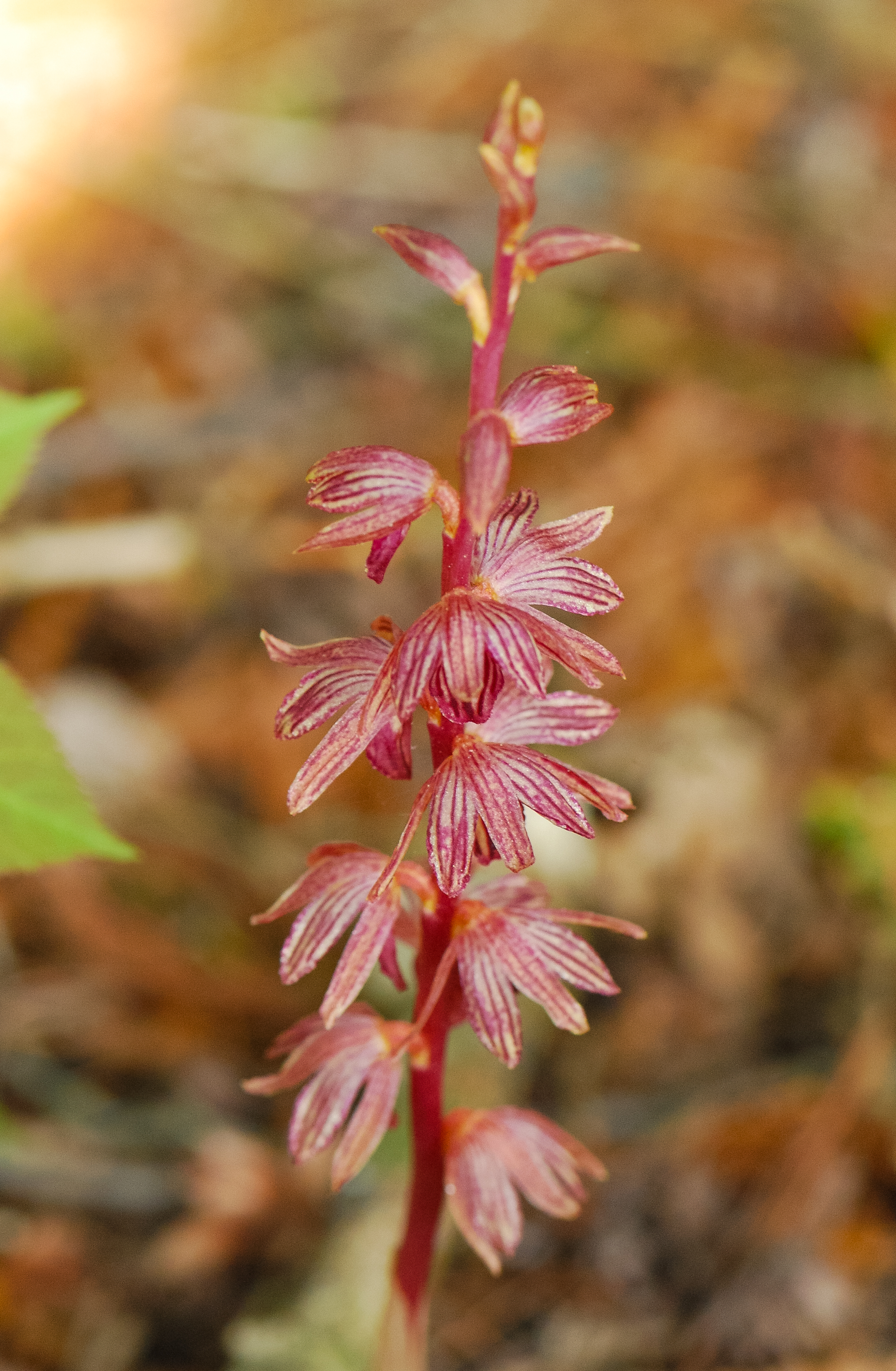
Details of the flowers

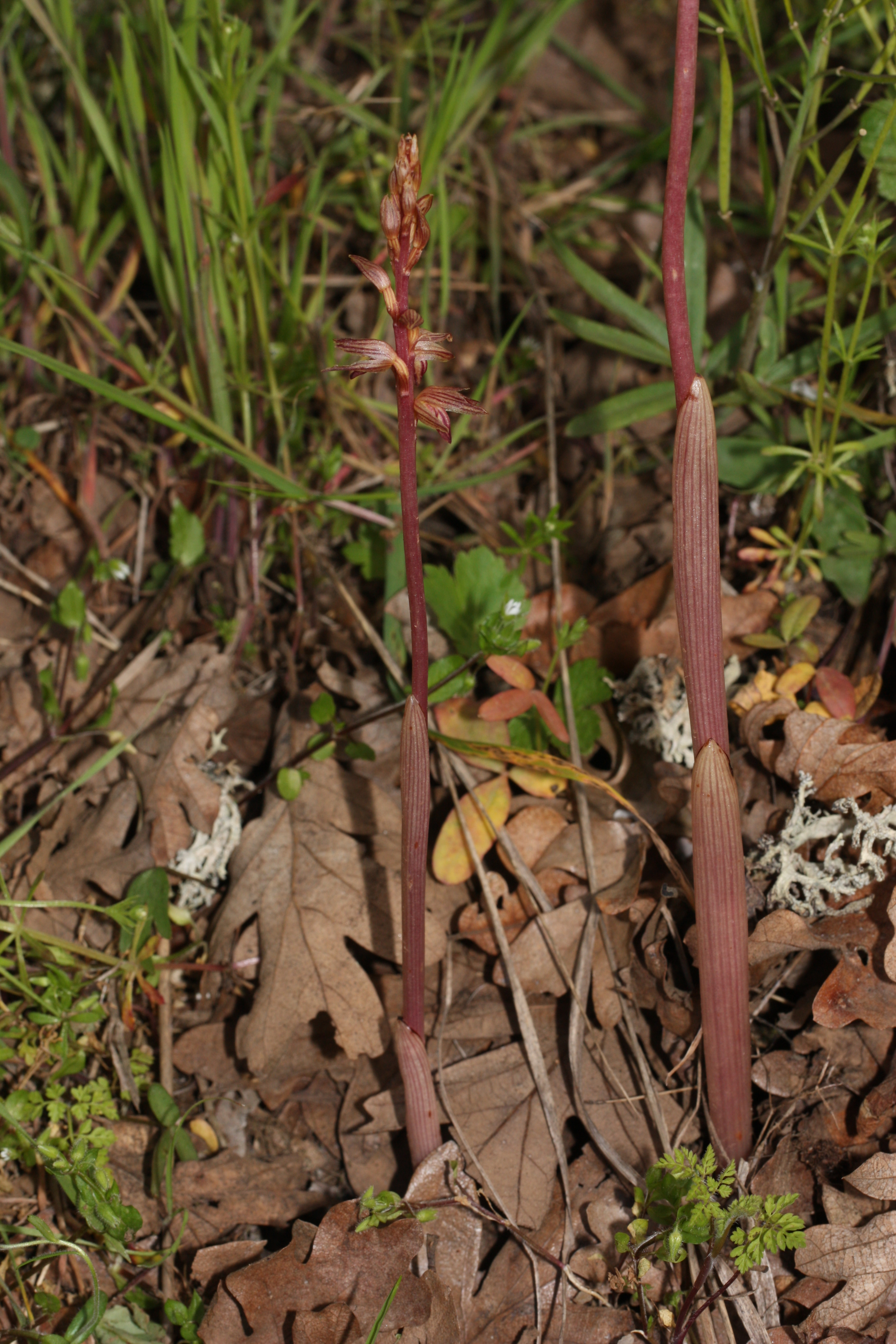
Stalk has not fully bloomed

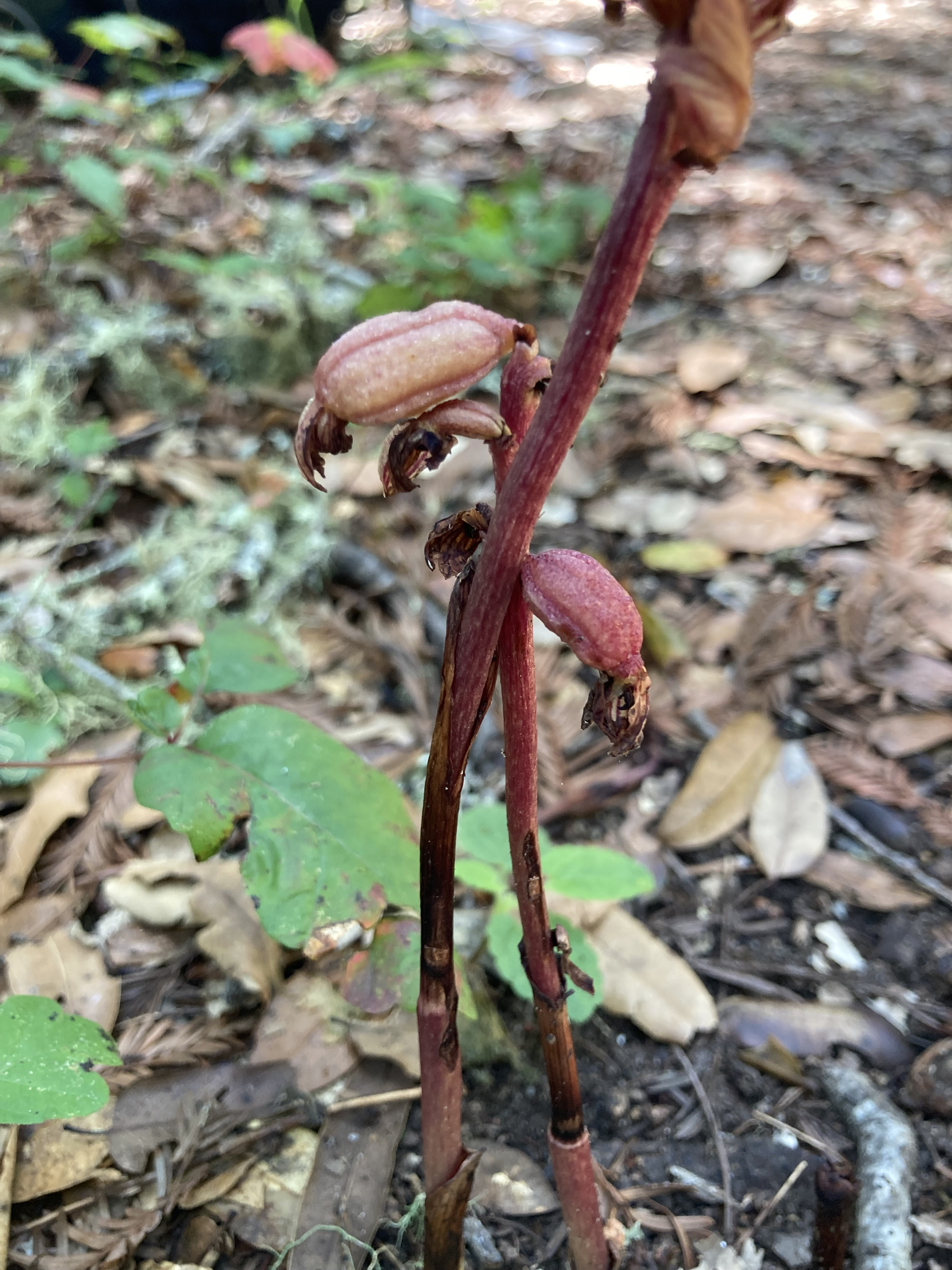
Detail of the seeds pods

== See also ==
- Corallorhiza maculata
