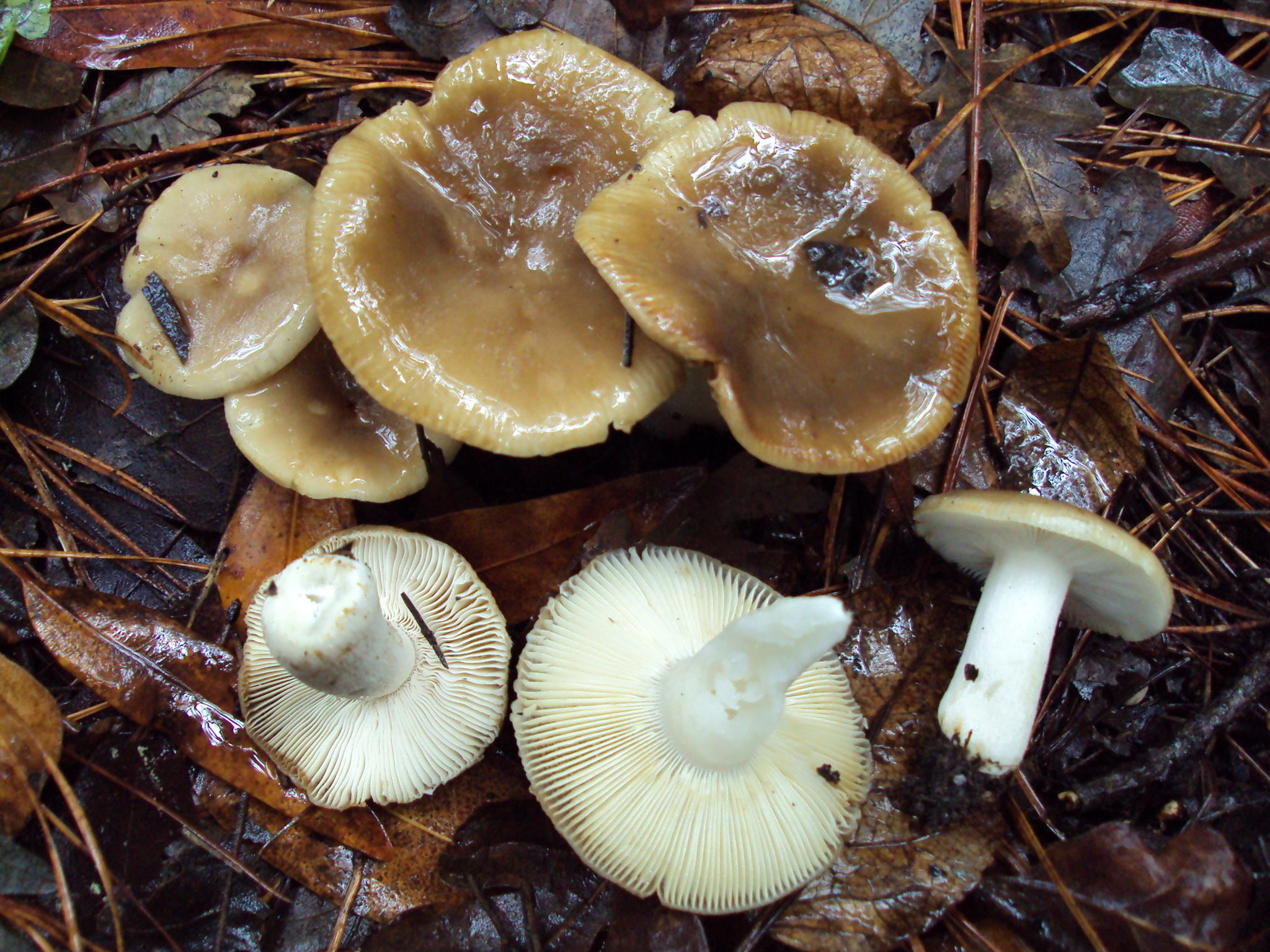

Scientific classification
- Domain: Eukaryota
- Kingdom: Fungi
- Division: Basidiomycota
- Class: Agaricomycetes
- Order: Russulales
- Family: Russulaceae
- Genus: Russula
- Species: R. amoenolens

Binomial name
- Russula amoenolens (Romagn.)

= Russula amoenolens =

Species of fungus

Russula amoenolens, also known by its common name camembert brittlegill, is a member of the genus Russula. The species has a greyish-brown cap, with clear scoring along the edge. While inedible, the mushroom is known for its distinctive smell like camembert cheese. The mushroom often appears under oak trees from summer to autumn.

== Taxonomy ==
The species was first described by French mycologist Henri Romagnesi in 1952.

== Distribution ==
Distribution of Russula amoenolens in Europe

The species is primarily found in Europe, but has also been reported in the United States, Costa Rica, Morocco and New Zealand.

== See also ==
- List of Russula species
