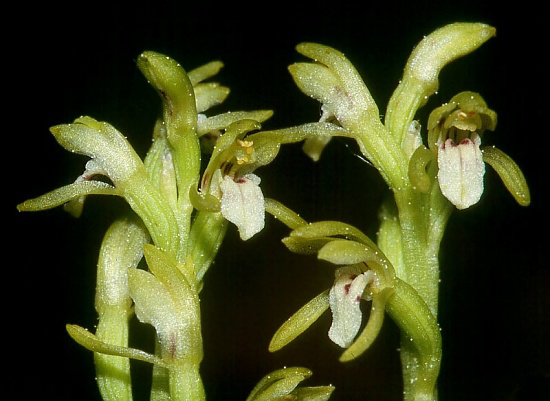
- Corallorhiza trifida

Scientific classification
- Kingdom: Plantae
- Clade: Embryophytes
- Clade: Tracheophytes
- Clade: Angiosperms
- Clade: Monocots
- Order: Asparagales
- Family: Orchidaceae
- Subfamily: Epidendroideae
- Tribe: Epidendreae
- Subtribe: Calypsoinae
- Genus: Corallorhiza; Gagnebin

Type species
- Corallorhiza trifida Châtel.

Synonyms
- Cladorhiza Raf.; Rhizocorallon Hall in H.B.Ruppius; Corallorrhiza Gagnebin, spelling variation

= Corallorhiza =

Genus of orchids

Corallorhiza, the coralroot, is a genus of flowering plants in the orchid family. Except for the circumboreal C. trifida, the genus is restricted to North America (including Mexico, Central America and the West Indies).

Most species are putatively parasitic, relying entirely upon mycorrhizal fungi within their coral-shaped rhizomes for sustenance. Because of this dependence on myco-heterotrophy, they have never been successfully cultivated. Most species are leafless and rootless. Most species produce little or no chlorophyll, and do not utilize photosynthesis. An exception is the yellowish green species Corallorhiza trifida, which has some chlorophyll and is able to fix CO_{2}. However, this species also depends primarily on fungal associations for carbon acquisition.

== List of species ==
Many species names have been proposed that are now considered synonyms of other species, or members of other genera. Species accepted as members of Corallorhiza as of January 2023:

Image	Scientific name	Distribution
	Corallorhiza bentleyi Freudenst.	Virginia, West Virginia
	Corallorhiza bulbosa A.Rich. & Galeotti	Mexico, Guatemala
	Corallorhiza ekmanii Mansf.	Haiti, Dominican Republic
	Corallorhiza macrantha Schltr.	Puebla, Veracruz, Oaxaca, Guatemala
	Corallorhiza maculata Raf.	widespread across much of Canada, the United States, Mexico and Guatemala
	Corallorhiza mertensiana Bong.	Alaska, Alberta, British Columbia, Idaho, Montana, Washington, California, Wyoming
	Corallorhiza odontorhiza (Willd.) Nutt.	eastern United States and Canada, from Texas to Florida, north to South Dakota, Ontario, Quebec and Maine
	Corallorhiza striata Lindl.	much of Canada and Mexico; northern and western United States
	Corallorhiza trifida Châtel	Canada; northern and western United States; widespread across Europe and Asia including Russia, China, Korea, the Himalayas, Ukraine, France, Germany, Italy, Spain, United Kingdom etc.
	Corallorhiza williamsii Correll	Morelos, El Salvador
	Corallorhiza wisteriana Conrad	Mexico and much of the United States

== See also ==
- Neottia
- Pterospora
