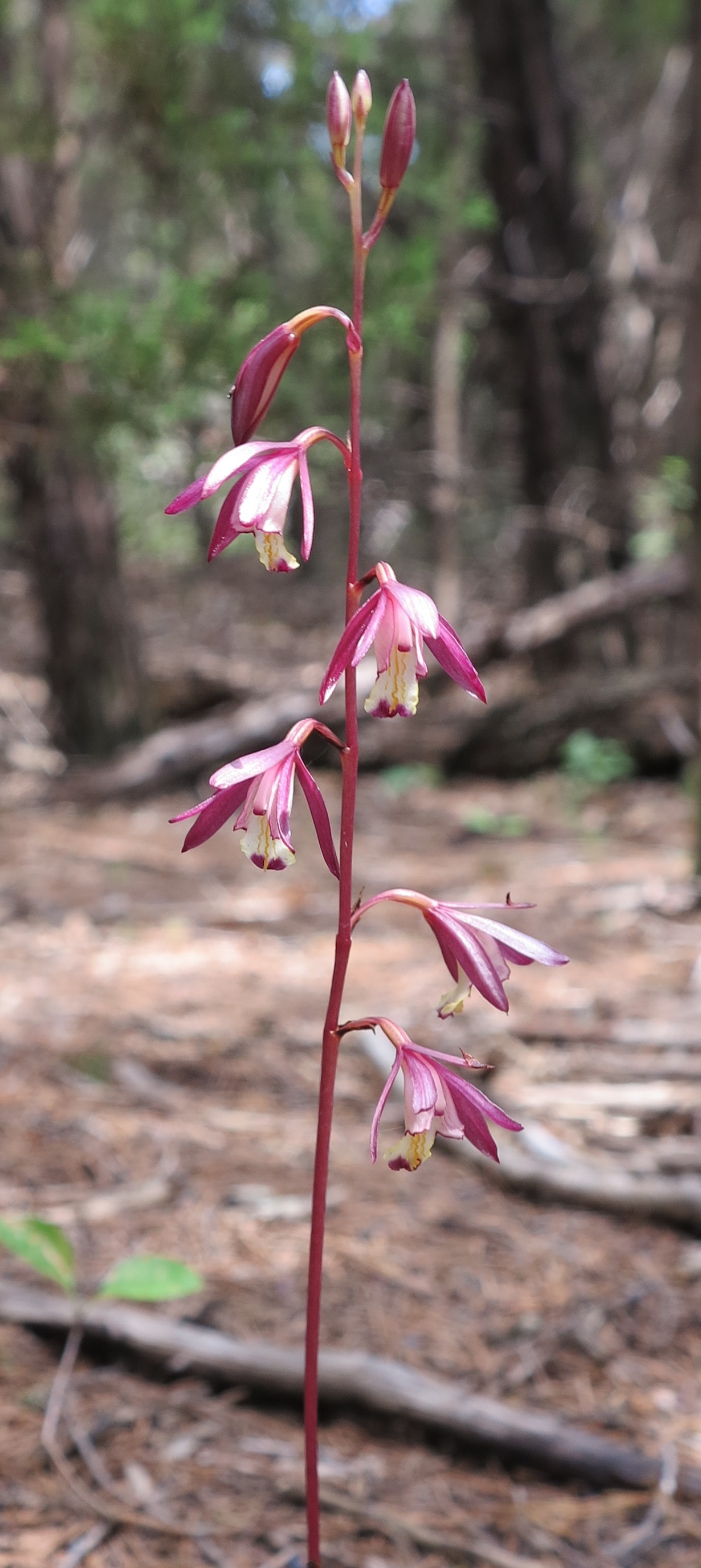
- Hexalectris warnockii in Dallas County, Texas

Scientific classification
- Kingdom: Plantae
- Clade: Tracheophytes
- Clade: Angiosperms
- Clade: Monocots
- Order: Asparagales
- Family: Orchidaceae
- Subfamily: Epidendroideae
- Genus: Hexalectris
- Species: H. warnockii

Binomial name
- Hexalectris warnockii Ames & Correll

= Hexalectris warnockii =

Species of orchid

Hexalectris warnockii, the Texas crested coralroot, Texas purple-spike, is a myco-heterotrophic orchid found in the states of Texas and Arizona in the southwestern United States, and in the states of Coahuila and Baja California Sur in northern Mexico. Being myco-heterotrophic, H. warnockii derives all of its nutrients from mycorrhizal fungi.
