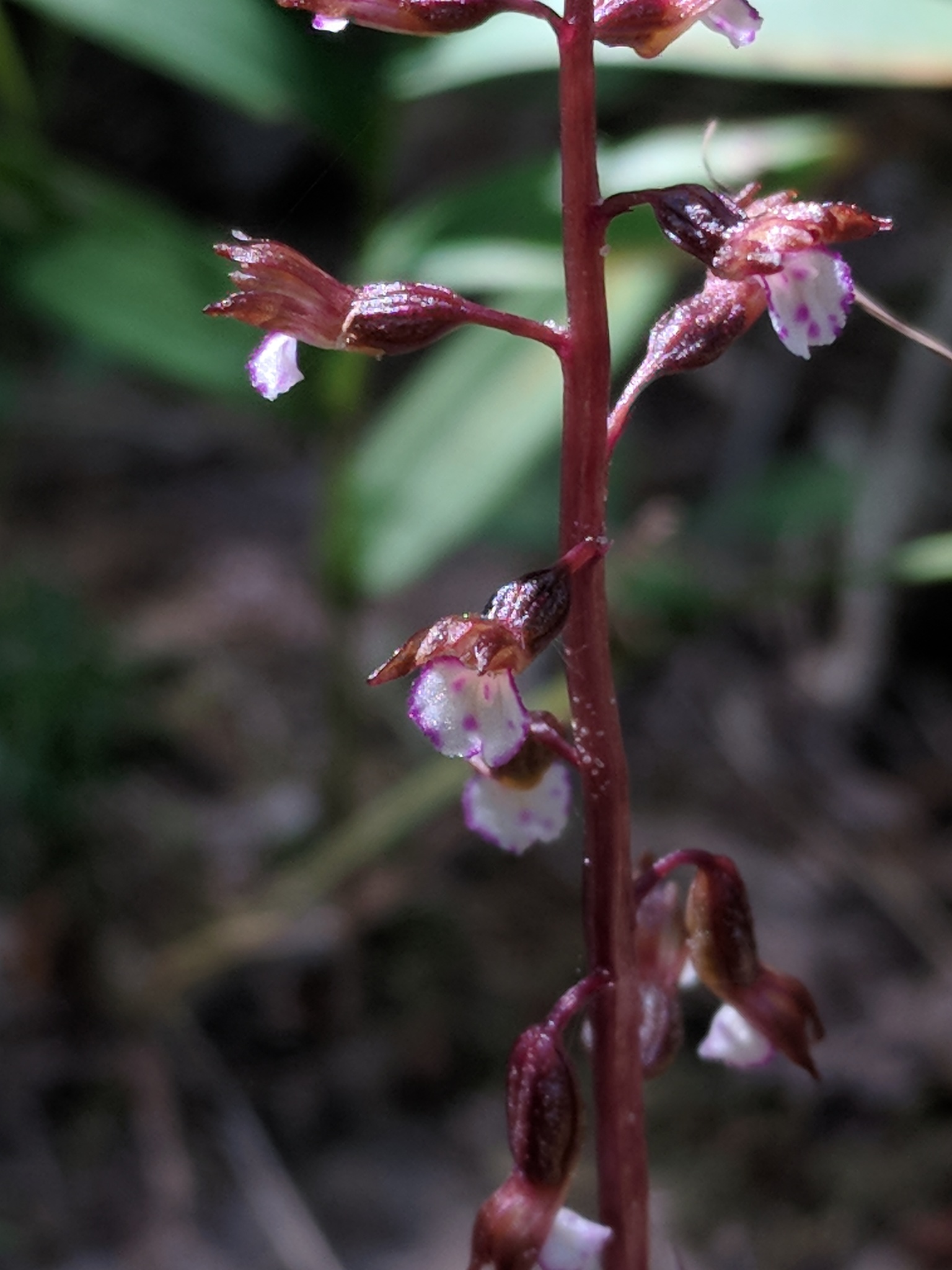

Scientific classification
- Kingdom: Plantae
- Clade: Tracheophytes
- Clade: Angiosperms
- Clade: Monocots
- Order: Asparagales
- Family: Orchidaceae
- Subfamily: Epidendroideae
- Genus: Corallorhiza
- Species: C. odontorhiza

Binomial name
- Corallorhiza odontorhiza (Willd.) Poir.

Synonyms
- Corallorhiza micrantha Chapm.; Corallorhiza montana Raf.; Corallorhiza odontorhiza (Willd.) Nutt.; Corallorhiza odontorhiza f. flavida Wherry; Corallorhiza odontorhiza var. verna Alph.Wood; Cymbidium odontorhizon Willd.; Epidendrum odontorhizon (Willd.) Poir.; Neottia odontorhiza (Nutt.) Kuntze

= Corallorhiza odontorhiza =

Species of orchid

Corallorhiza odontorhiza, common name fall coral-root or small-flowered coral-root, is a species of orchid widespread across eastern and central United States, and reported also from Mexico, Central America, Quebec and Ontario. In North America, it occurs in forested areas up to an elevation of 2800 m (9300 feet).

Corallorhiza odontorhiza is a non-photosynthetic species, with no chlorophyll. Hence it relies on fungi in the soil to supply it with nutrients. Stems are yellow to brown, bulbous at the base. There are no leaves. Flowers are typically reddish-purple with a white lip, the lip with small purple spots, though some plants are cleistogamous with non-opening flowers. The plant flowers from August through October in the eastern US.

== Infraspecific taxa ==
Three infraspecific taxa are recognized as of May 2014:

- Corallorhiza odontorhiza var. odontorhiza – Quebec, Ontario, eastern and central United States
- Corallorhiza odontorhiza var. pringlei (Greenm.) Freudenst. – Mexico, Central America, Ontario, eastern United States
- Corallorhiza odontorhiza var. pringlei f. radia Freudenst. – southern Mexico, Guatemala, El Salvador

=== Corallorhiza odontorhiza var. odontorhiza ===
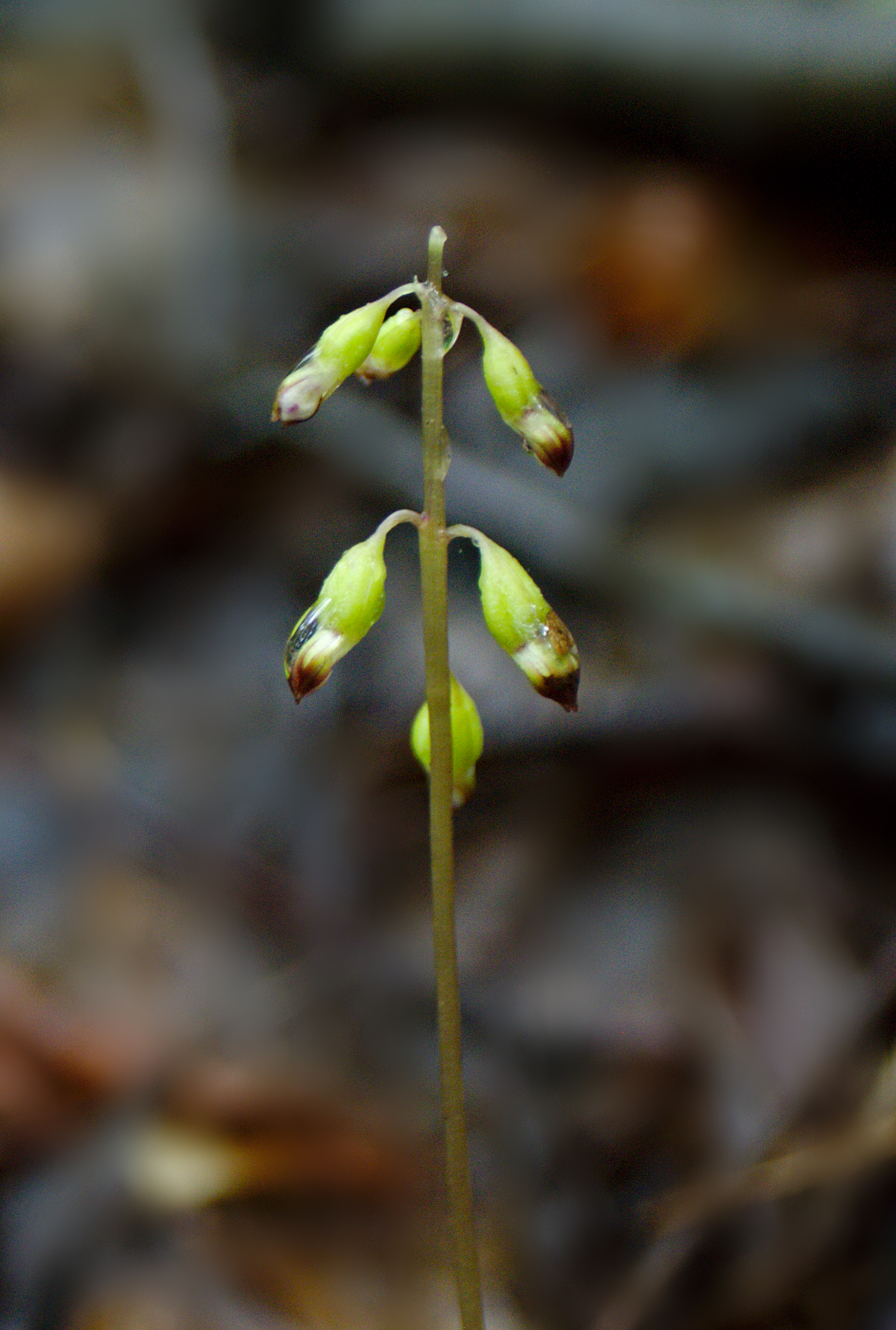
Corallorhiza odontorhiza var. odontorhiza. Most flowers are closed in this variety

The flowers of var. odontorhiza are cleistogamous and either closed or only slightly open. Often one or two flowers in a raceme will be open slightly more than the others and a narrow lip (2.6–3.8mm long, 1.7–2.2mm wide) may be visible. Because flowers self-pollinate and no external pollinators are required first, the ovaries of this variation will start swelling soon after flowering.

=== Corallorhiza odontorhiza var. pringlei f. pringlei ===
Flowers of var. pringlei are chasmogamous and will open up. Their upper two petals and upper sepal form a hood, with the two side sepals bending outwards. The lip is visible and wider than with var. odonthoriza – it is used by pollinators to land on.

=== Corallorhiza odontorhiza var. pringlei f. radia ===
This form of var. pringlei is only known from southern Mexico, Guatemala and El Salvador. It is completely cleistogamous and peloric – that is unlike with var. odontorhiza the bottom-most petal does not form a lip but looks just like the other 5 petals/sepals. Since it is assumed that a peloric form of the orchid could develop anywhere as a spontaneous mutation it is only recognized as a form and not a full variation.
