= Hexalectris grandiflora =

Scientific classification
- Kingdom: Plantae
- Clade: Tracheophytes
- Clade: Angiosperms
- Clade: Monocots
- Order: Asparagales
- Family: Orchidaceae
- Subfamily: Epidendroideae
- Genus: Hexalectris
- Species: H. grandiflora

Binomial name
- Hexalectris grandiflora (A.Rich. & Galeotti) L.O.Williams

Synonyms
- Corallorhiza grandiflora A.Rich. & Galeotti; Hexalectris mexicana Greenm.; Hexalectris grandiflora f. luteoalba P.M.Br.

Species of orchid

Hexalectris grandiflora, the largeflower crested coralroot or giant coral-root, is a species of orchid native to Mexico from Chihuahua south to Oaxaca, as well as to western and north-central Texas. It is a myco-heterotrophic species, lacking chlorophyll and subsisting entirely on nutrients obtained by fungi in the soil.
