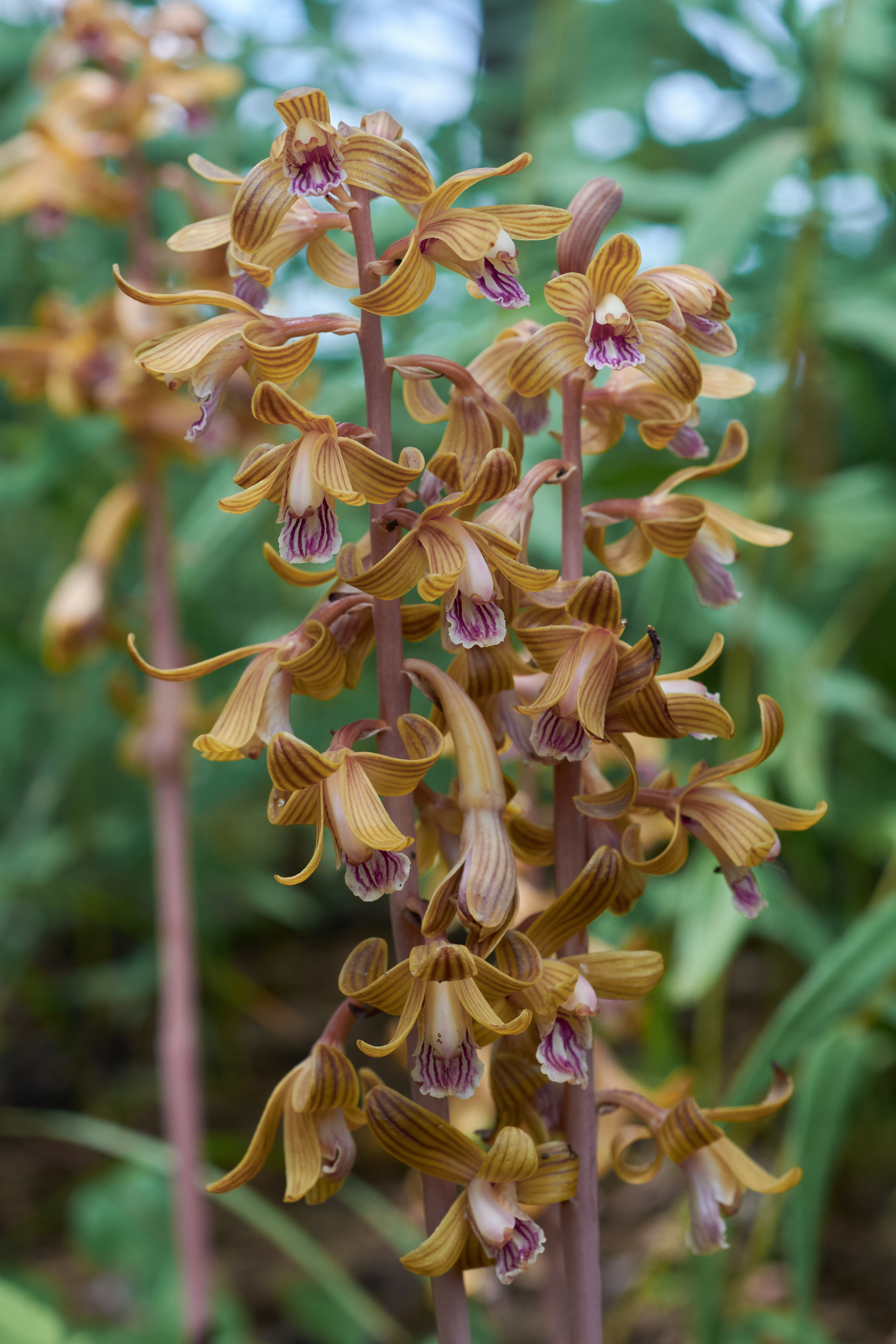
- Hexalectris spicata

Scientific classification
- Kingdom: Plantae
- Clade: Embryophytes
- Clade: Tracheophytes
- Clade: Angiosperms
- Clade: Monocots
- Order: Asparagales
- Family: Orchidaceae
- Subfamily: Epidendroideae
- Tribe: Epidendreae
- Subtribe: Bletiinae
- Genus: Hexalectris; Raf.

Type species
- Hexalectris spicata (Walter) Barnhart

= Hexalectris =

Crested coralroot

Genus of orchids

Hexalectris (crested coralroot) is a genus of the family Orchidaceae, comprising 10 known species of fully myco-heterotrophic orchids. These species are found in North America, with the center of diversity in northern Mexico. None of the species are particularly common. Hexalectris spicata has a wide distribution and is likely the most abundant member of the genus, but is nevertheless infrequent throughout its range. Other species are rare, and some, such as H. colemanii, are threatened or endangered. All species that have been studied form associations with ectomycorrhizal fungi that are likely linked to surrounding trees. Many Hexalectris species are found in association with oak trees (Quercus), which are ectomycorrhizal.

== Species ==
Species accepted as of June 2014:

Image	Scientific name	Distribution
	Hexalectris arizonica (S.Watson) A.H.Kenn. & L.E.Watson (2010)	Arizona, New Mexico, Texas, Coahuila
	Hexalectris brevicaulis L.O.Williams (1940)	central and southern Mexico
	Hexalectris colemanii (Catling) A.H.Kenn. & L.E.Watson (2010)	southern Arizona
	Hexalectris fallax M.I.Rodr. & R.González (2005)	Jalisco
	Hexalectris grandiflora (A.Rich. & Galeotti) L.O.Williams (1944)	widespread from Texas and Chihuahua south to Oaxaca
	Hexalectris nitida L.O.Williams (1944)	from Texas and New Mexico to southern Mexico
	Hexalectris parviflora L.O.Williams (1940)	from Sonora to Guatemala
	Hexalectris revoluta Correll (1941)	western Texas, southeastern New Mexico, northeastern Mexico
	Hexalectris spicata (Walter) Barnhart (1904)	United States from Arizona east to Florida and Maryland
	Hexalectris warnockii Ames & Correll (1943	Arizona, New Mexico, Texas, northern Mexico
