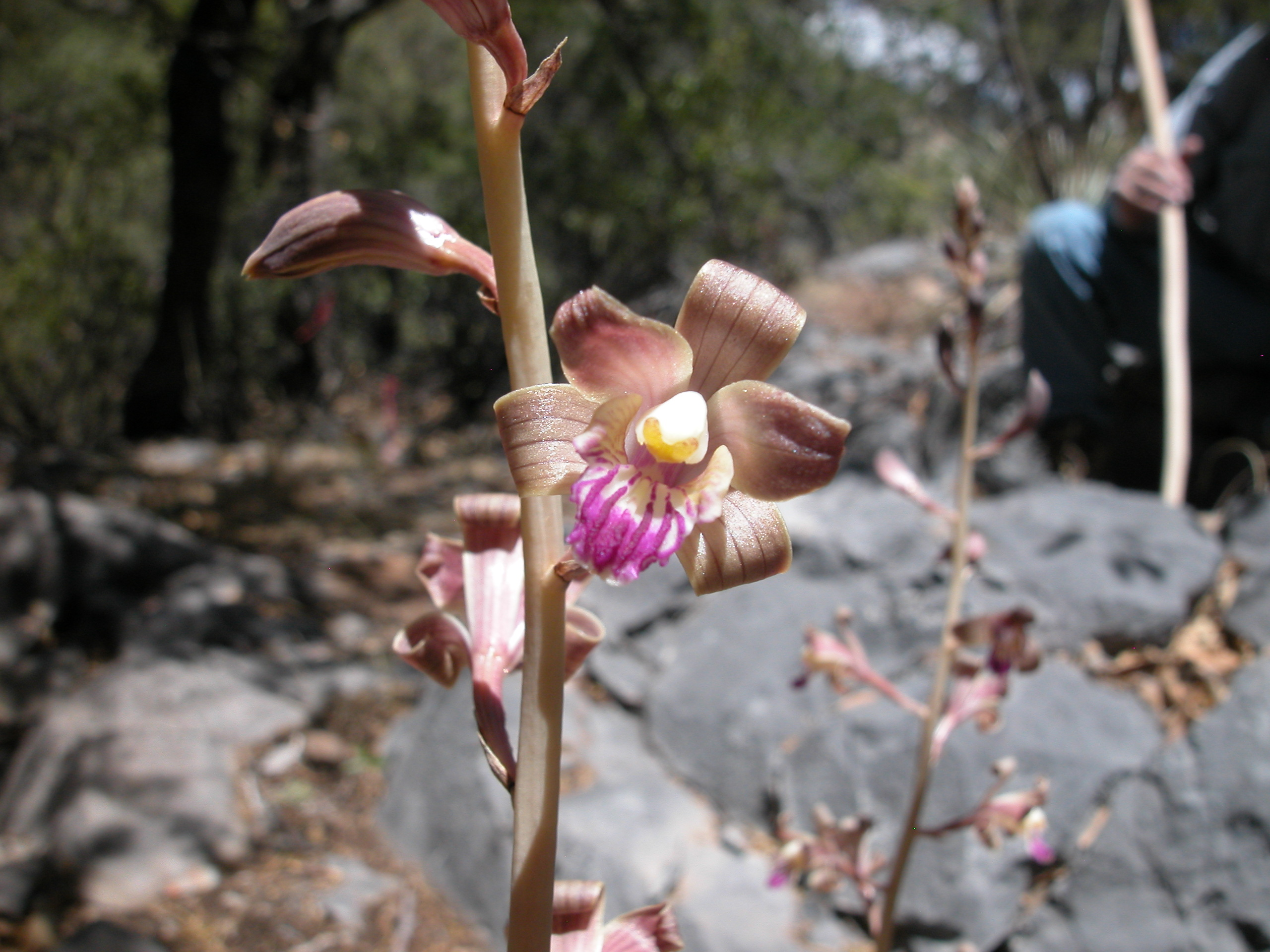

Scientific classification
- Kingdom: Plantae
- Clade: Embryophytes
- Clade: Tracheophytes
- Clade: Angiosperms
- Clade: Monocots
- Order: Asparagales
- Family: Orchidaceae
- Subfamily: Epidendroideae
- Genus: Hexalectris
- Species: H. colemanii

Binomial name
- Hexalectris colemanii (Catling) A.H.Kenn. & L.E.Watson

Synonyms
- Hexalectris revoluta var. colemanii Catling

= Hexalectris colemanii =

Species of orchid

Hexalectris colemanii, or Coleman's crested coralroot, is a terrestrial, myco-heterotrophic orchid lacking chlorophyll and subsisting entirely on nutrients obtained from mycorrhizal fungi in the soil. It is a very rare species endemic to southern Arizona, known from only three counties (Pima, Cochise and Santa Cruz). It is closely related to H. revoluta and the two are sometimes considered varieties of the same species.
