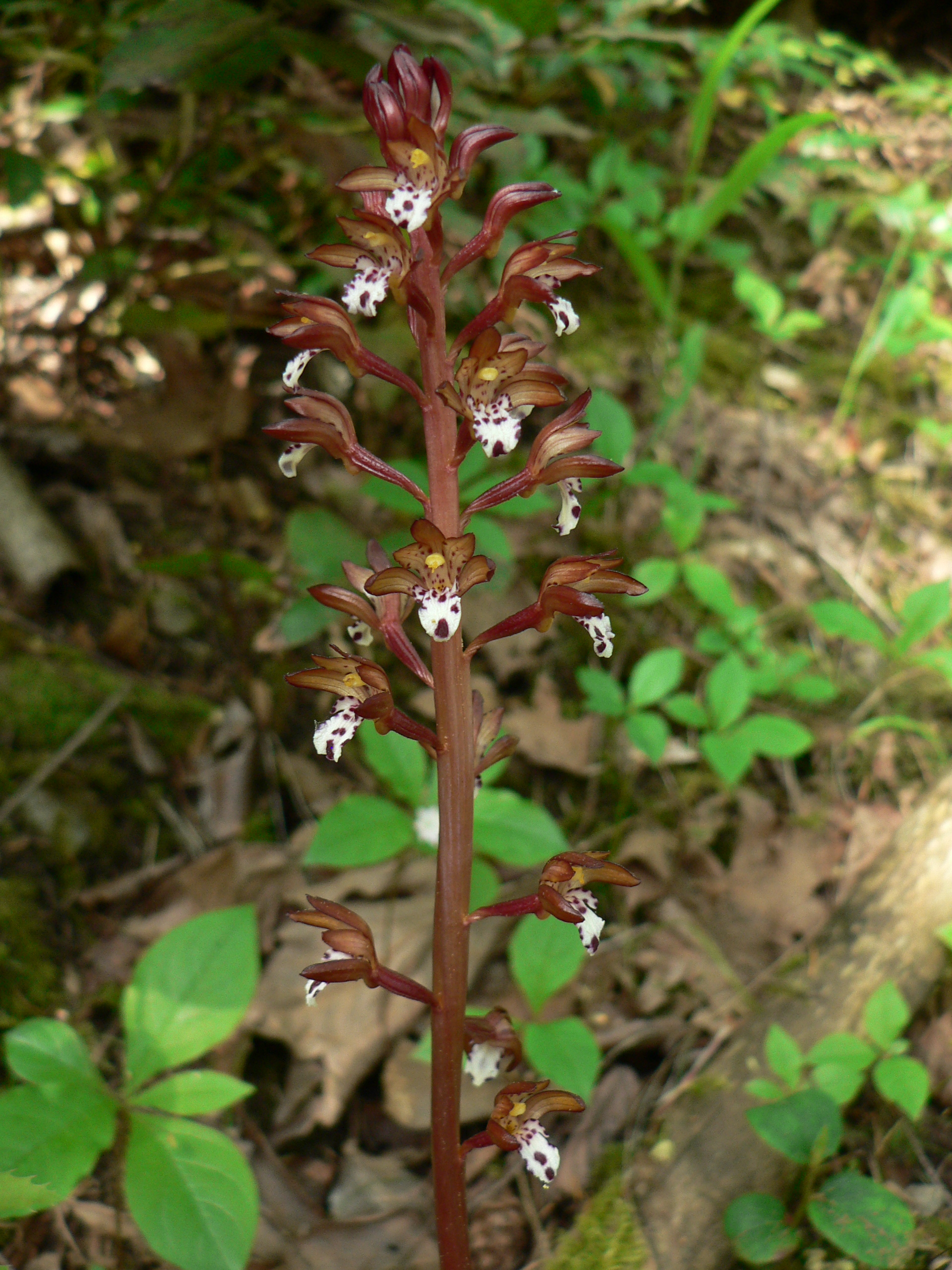
- Corallorhiza maculata var. maculata

Conservation status
- Secure (NatureServe)

Scientific classification
- Kingdom: Plantae
- Clade: Embryophytes
- Clade: Tracheophytes
- Clade: Spermatophytes
- Clade: Angiosperms
- Clade: Monocots
- Order: Asparagales
- Family: Orchidaceae
- Subfamily: Epidendroideae
- Genus: Corallorhiza
- Species: C. maculata

Binomial name
- Corallorhiza maculata Raf.

Varieties
- C. m. var. maculata; C. m. var. mexicana; C. m. var. occidentalis

Synonyms
- Cladorhiza maculata

= Corallorhiza maculata =

North American orchid species

Corallorhiza maculata, or spotted coralroot, is a North American coralroot orchid. It has three varieties: C. maculata var. occidentalis (western spotted coralroot), C. maculata var. maculata (eastern spotted coralroot or summer coralroot), and C. maculata var. mexicana. It is widespread through Mexico, Guatemala, Canada, Saint Pierre and Miquelon, and much of the western and northern United States (though generally absent from the Great Plains and from the lowland parts of the Southeast). It grows mostly in montane woodlands.

== Description ==
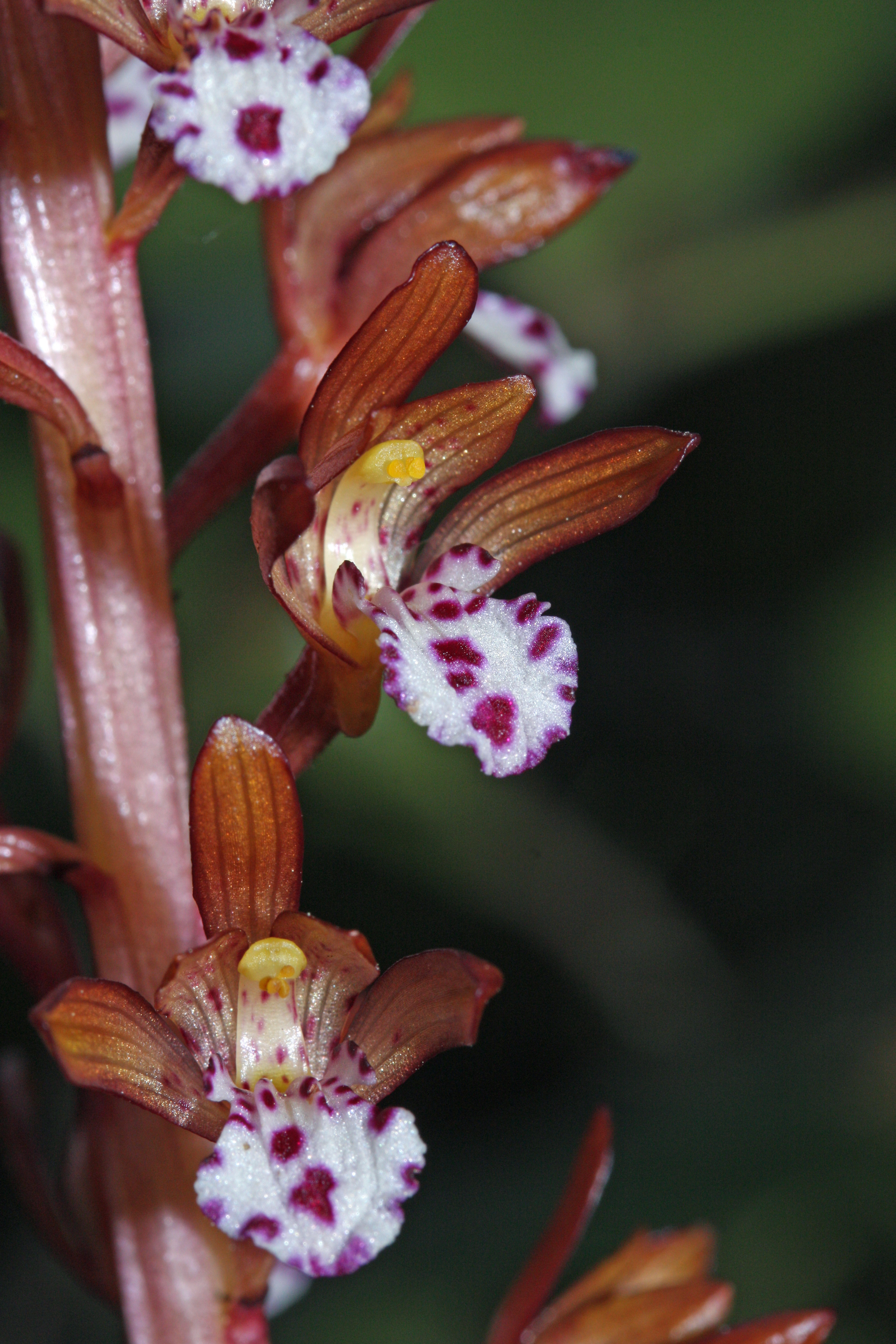
The Corallorhiza maculata side petals are reddish, and the lip petal is bright clean white with deep red spots.

Corallorhiza maculata is a myco-heterotroph; it lacks chlorophyll and obtains energy by parasitizing the mycelium of fungi in the family Russulaceae. The rhizome and lower stem are often knotted into branched coral shapes. The stem is usually red or brown in color, but occasionally comes in a light yellow or cream color. There are no leaves and no photosynthetic green tissues. The stems bear dark red scales and intricate orchid flowers.

Corallorhiza maculata flowers are small and emerge regularly from all sides of the stem. The sepals are dark red or brown tinged with purple, long and pointed. The side petals are reddish, and the lip petal is bright clean white with deep red spots. It is usually scalloped along its edges and 7–10 mm (9/32–13/32 in). In some varieties, the lip may be plain white without spots.

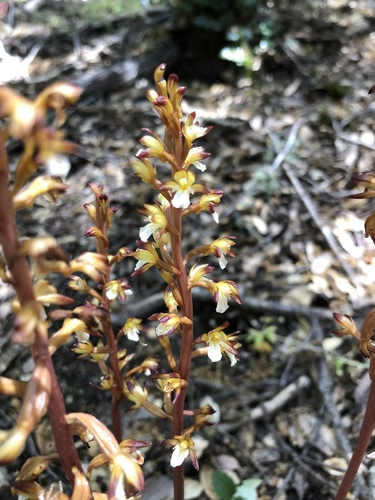
An unspotted form of Corallorhiza maculata that moreover bears yellow-tinged petals and sepals.

== Taxonomy ==
Corallorhiza maculata was scientifically described and named by Constantine Rafinesque in 1817. It is classified in the genus Corallorhiza within the family Orchidaceae. It has three varieties according to Plants of the World Online:

- Corallorhiza maculata var. maculata
- Corallorhiza maculata var. mexicana (Lindl.) Freudenst.
- Corallorhiza maculata var. occidentalis (Lindl.) Ames

Corallorhiza maculata has 23 synonyms of the species or one of its three varieties.

Table of Synonyms
Name	Year	Rank	Synonym of:	Notes
Cladorhiza maculata (Raf.) Raf.	1828	species	C. maculata	≡ hom.
Corallorhiza grabhamii Cockerell	1903	species	var. occidentalis	= het.
Corallorhiza leimbachiana Suksd.	1906	species	var. occidentalis	= het.
Corallorhiza maculata f. aurea P.M.Br.	1995	form	var. maculata	= het.
Corallorhiza maculata var. flavida (M.Peck) Cockerell	1916	variety	var. maculata	= het.
Corallorhiza maculata f. flavida (M.Peck) Farw.	1927	form	var. maculata	= het.
Corallorhiza maculata var. fusca Bartlett	1922	variety	var. maculata	= het.
Corallorhiza maculata var. immaculata M.Peck	1950	variety	var. maculata	= het.
Corallorhiza maculata f. immaculata (M.Peck) J.T.Howell	1970	form	var. maculata	= het.
Corallorhiza maculata var. intermedia Farw.	1917	variety	var. maculata	= het.
Corallorhiza maculata f. intermedia (Farw.) Farw.	1927	form	var. maculata	= het.
Corallorhiza maculata subsp. occidentalis (Lindl.) Cockerell	1916	subspecies	var. occidentalis	≡ hom.
Corallorhiza maculata var. ozettensis Tisch	2001	variety	var. maculata	= het.
Corallorhiza maculata var. punicea Bartlett	1922	variety	var. maculata	= het.
Corallorhiza maculata f. punicea (Bartlett) Weath. & J.Adams	1945	form	var. maculata	= het.
Corallorhiza maculata f. rubra P.M.Br.	1995	form	var. maculata	= het.
Corallorhiza mexicana Lindl.	1840	species	var. mexicana	≡ hom.
Corallorhiza multiflora Nutt.	1823	species	var. maculata	= het.
Corallorhiza multiflora var. flavida M.Peck	1897	variety	var. maculata	= het.
Corallorhiza multiflora var. occidentalis Lindl.	1840	variety	var. occidentalis	≡ hom.
Corallorhiza multiflora var. sulphurea Suksd.	1906	variety	var. maculata	= het.
Neottia mexicana (Lindl.) Kuntze	1891	species	var. mexicana	≡ hom.
Neottia multiflora (Nutt.) Kuntze	1891	species	var. maculata	= het.
Notes: ≡ homotypic synonym; = heterotypic synonym

== Uses ==
Several Native American groups historically used the orchid's stems dried and brewed as a tea for such maladies as colds, pneumonia, and skin irritation.

Corallorhiza maculata is also the topic of the poem On Going Unnoticed by Robert Frost.

== Gallery ==
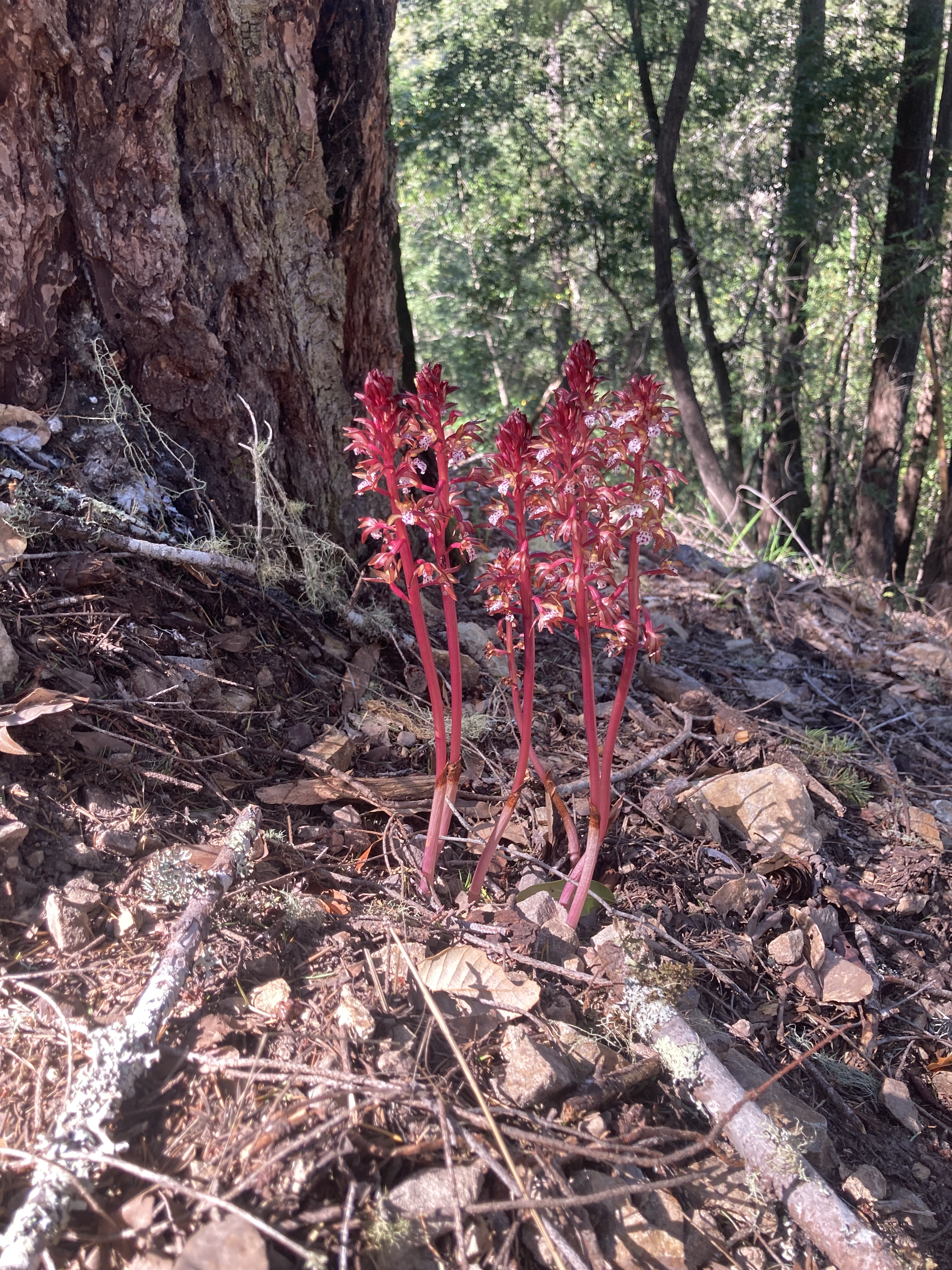
Corallorhiza maculata var occidentalis in Sonoma County.

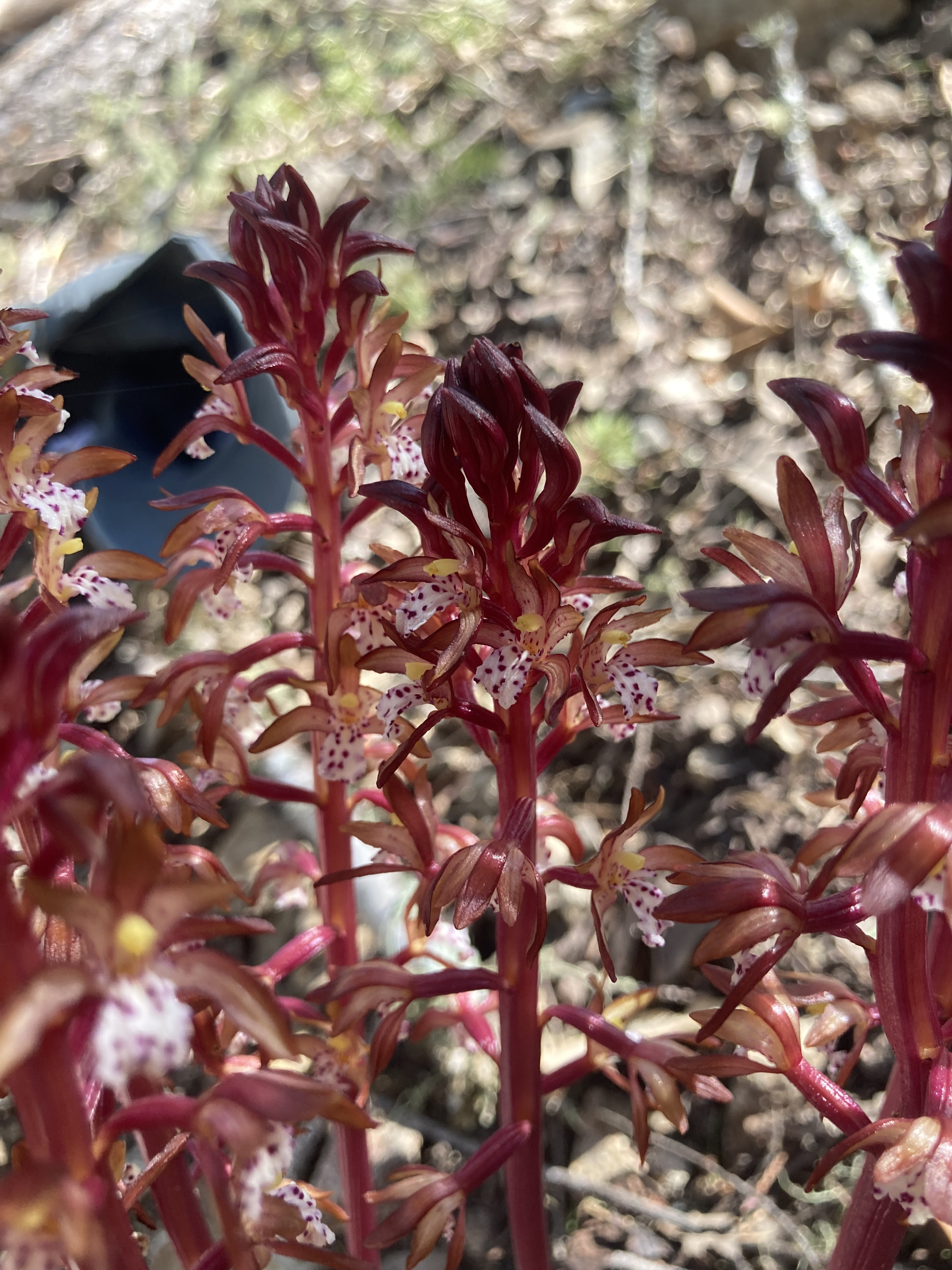
Detail of the flowers.

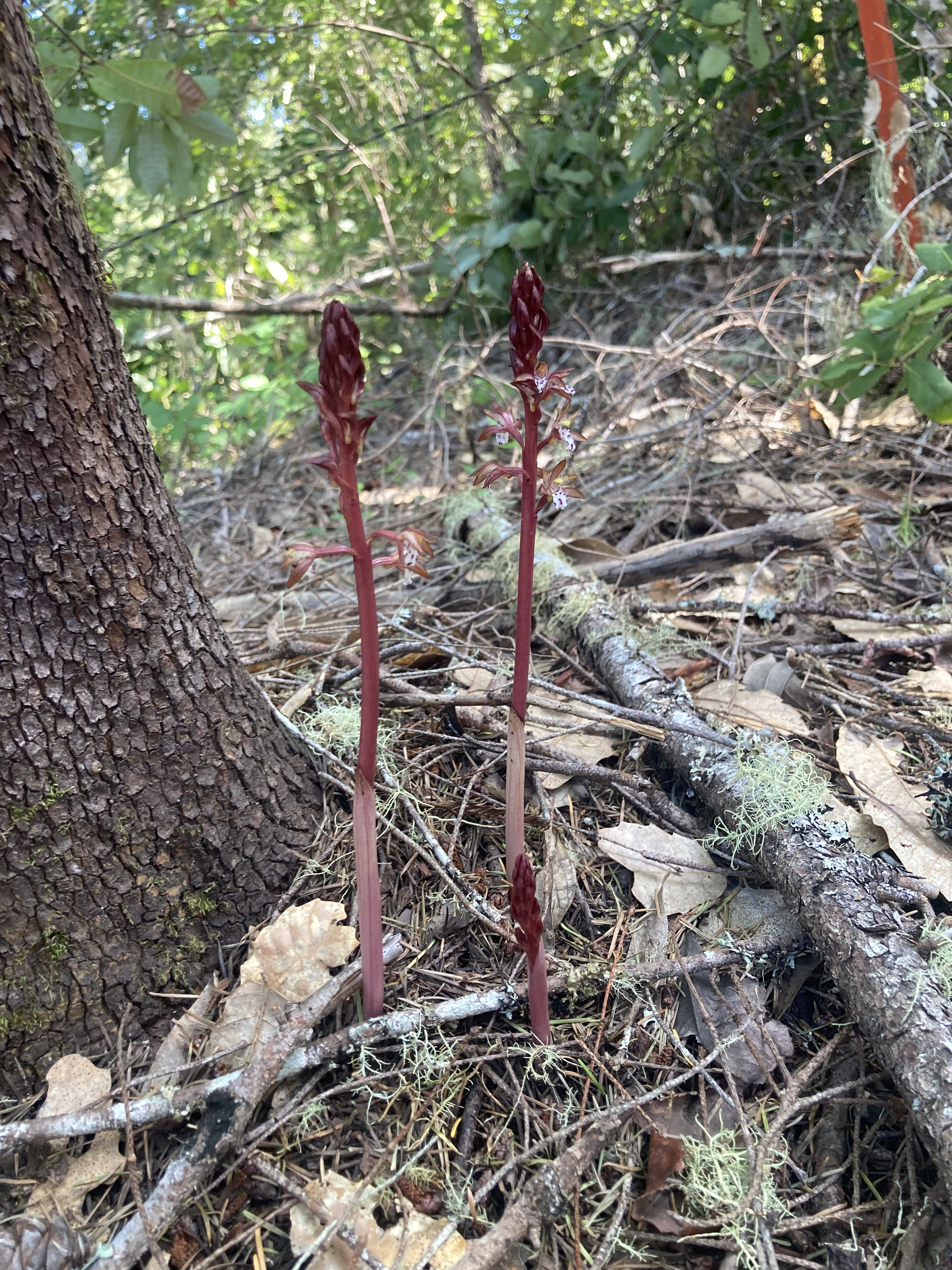
First blooms: only a few flowers have opened.

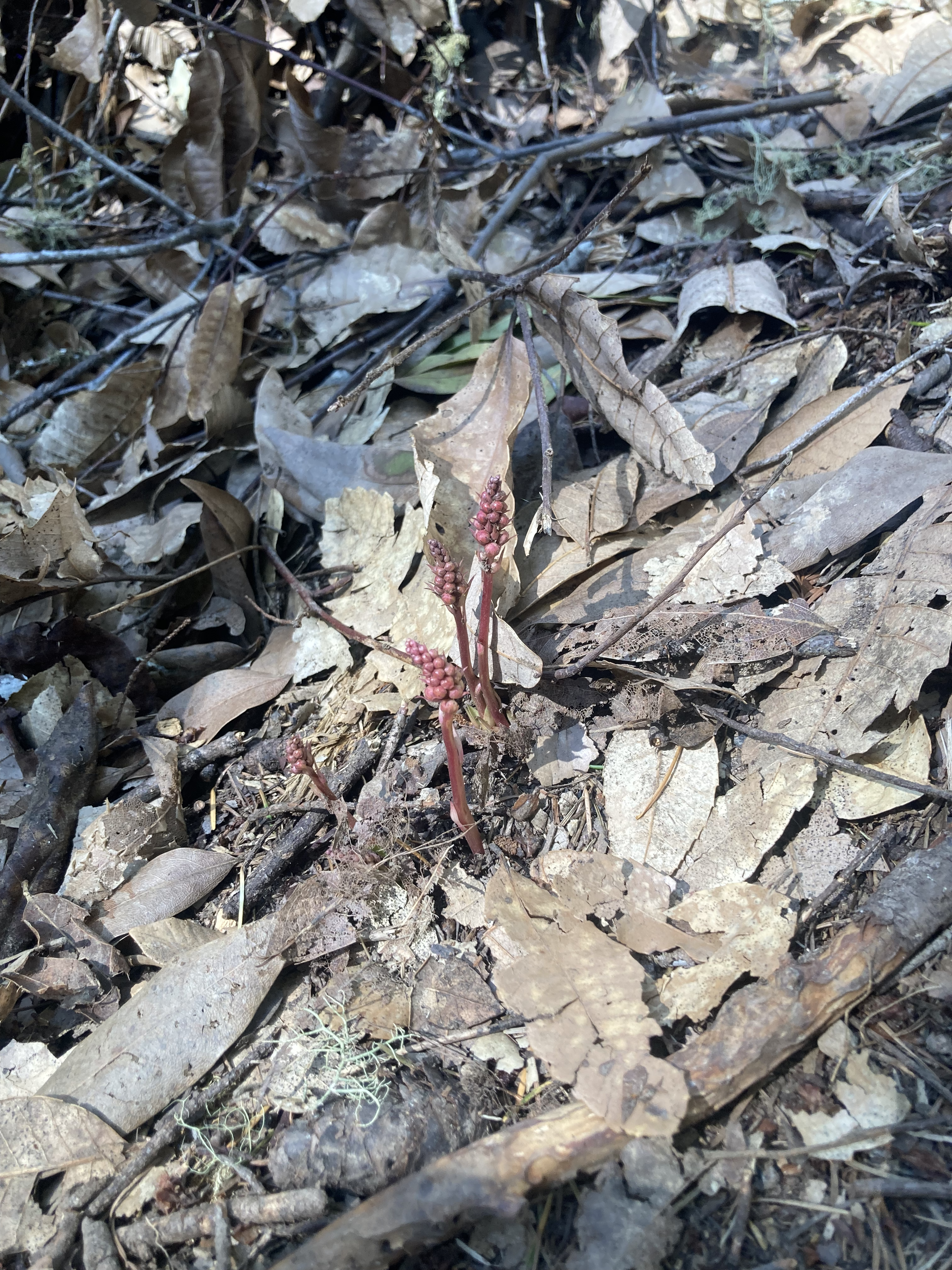
First flower shoot.

== See also ==
- Corallorhiza striata
