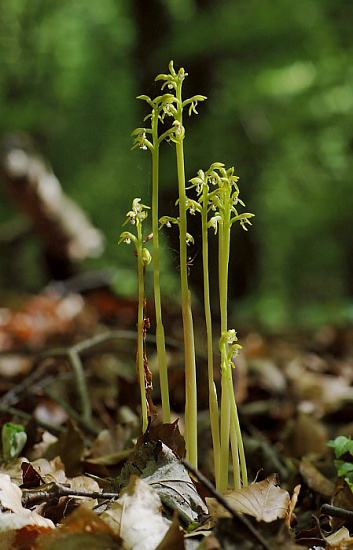

Conservation status
- Least Concern (IUCN 3.1)

- Secure (NatureServe)

Scientific classification
- Kingdom: Plantae
- Clade: Embryophytes
- Clade: Tracheophytes
- Clade: Spermatophytes
- Clade: Angiosperms
- Clade: Monocots
- Order: Asparagales
- Family: Orchidaceae
- Subfamily: Epidendroideae
- Genus: Corallorhiza
- Species: C. trifida

Binomial name
- Corallorhiza trifida Châtel.

Synonyms
- List: Corallorhiza corallorhiza; Corallorhiza innata; Cymbidium corallorhiza; Epidendrum corallorhizon; Epipactis corallorhiza; Helleborine corallorhiza; Neottia corallorhiza; Ophrys corallorhiza

= Corallorhiza trifida =

Northern hemisphere orchid species

Corallorhiza trifida, commonly known as early coralroot, northern coralroot, or yellow coralroot, is a coralroot orchid native to North America and Eurasia, with a circumboreal distribution. The species has been reported from the United States, Canada, Russia, China, Japan, Korea, India, Nepal, Kashmir, Pakistan, and almost every country in Europe.

== Description ==
Corallorhiza trifida is yellowish green in color, leafless, and partially myco-heterotrophic, deriving some, but not all of its nutrients from association with fungi of genus Tomentella. It also contains chlorophyll, with which it supplies some of its own carbon nutrition via autotrophy.

== Taxonomy ==
Corallorhiza trifida was scientifically named by Jean Jacques Châtelain in 1760. It is classified in the genus Corallorhiza as part of the Orchidaceae family. It has no accepted subspecies or varieties, but it has 35 synonyms.

Table of Synonyms
Name	Year	Rank	Notes
Corallorhiza anandae Malhotra & Balodi	1984	species	= het.
Corallorhiza corallorhiza (L.) H.Karst.	1886	species	≡ hom., not validly publ.
Corallorhiza corallorhiza subsp. coloradensis Cockerell	1916	subspecies	= het., not validly publ.
Corallorhiza dentata Host	1831	species	= het.
Corallorhiza ericetorum Drejer	1843	species	= het.
Corallorhiza halleri Rich.	1817	species	= het.
Corallorhiza innata R.Br.	1813	species	≡ hom.
Corallorhiza innata var. discolor Rchb.	1830	variety	= het.
Corallorhiza innata subsp. ericetorum (Drejer) Nyman	1882	subspecies	= het.
Corallorhiza innata var. ericetorum (Drejer) Rchb.f.	1851	variety	= het.
Corallorhiza innata var. virescens (Drejer) Farr	1904	variety	= het.
Corallorhiza intacta Cham. & Schltdl.	1828	species	= het., orth. var.
Corallorhiza integra Châtel.	1760	species	= het.
Corallorhiza jacquemontii Decne.	1844	species	= het.
Corallorhiza nemoralis Sw. ex Nyman	1882	species	= het., not validly publ.
Corallorhiza neottia Scop.	1771	species	= het.
Corallorhiza occidentalis Bach.Pyl.	1826	species	= het.
Corallorhiza trifida var. ericetorum (Drejer) Rchb.f.	1851	variety	= het.
Corallorhiza trifida f. ericetorum (Drejer) Soó	1928	form	= het.
Corallorhiza trifida var. integra (Châtel.) Schinz & Thell.	1914	variety	= het.
Corallorhiza trifida f. integra (Châtel.) Soó	1928	form	= het.
Corallorhiza trifida f. suaveolens Bordz.	1950	form	= het.
Corallorhiza trifida var. verna (Nutt.) Fernald	1946	variety	= het.
Corallorhiza trifida f. verna (Nutt.) P.M.Br.	2006	form	= het.
Corallorhiza trifida subsp. virescens (Drejer) Løjtnant	1996	subspecies	= het.
Corallorhiza trifida var. virescens (Drejer) Farw.	1941	variety	= het.
Corallorhiza verna Nutt.	1823	species	= het.
Corallorhiza virescens Drejer	1843	species	= het.
Corallorhiza wyomingensis Hellm. & K.Hellm.	1931	species	= het.
Cymbidium corallorhiza (L.) Sw.	1800	species	≡ hom.
Epidendrum corallorhizon (L.) Poir.	1810	species	≡ hom.
Epipactis corallorhiza (L.) Crantz	1769	species	≡ hom.
Helleborine corallorhiza (L.) F.W.Schmidt	1793	species	≡ hom.
Neottia corallorhiza (L.) Kuntze	1891	species	≡ hom.
Ophrys corallorhiza L.	1753	species	≡ hom.
Notes: ≡ homotypic synonym; = heterotypic synonym

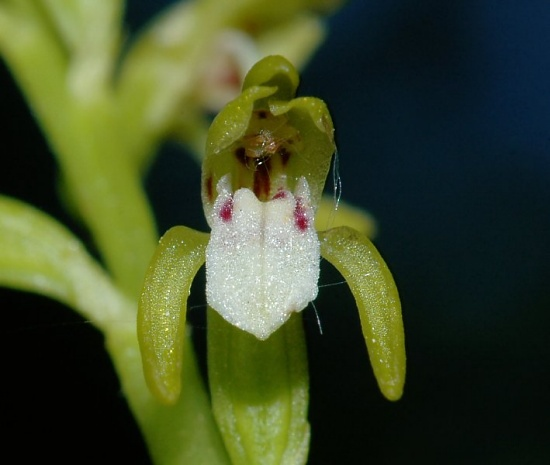
Closeup of a flower

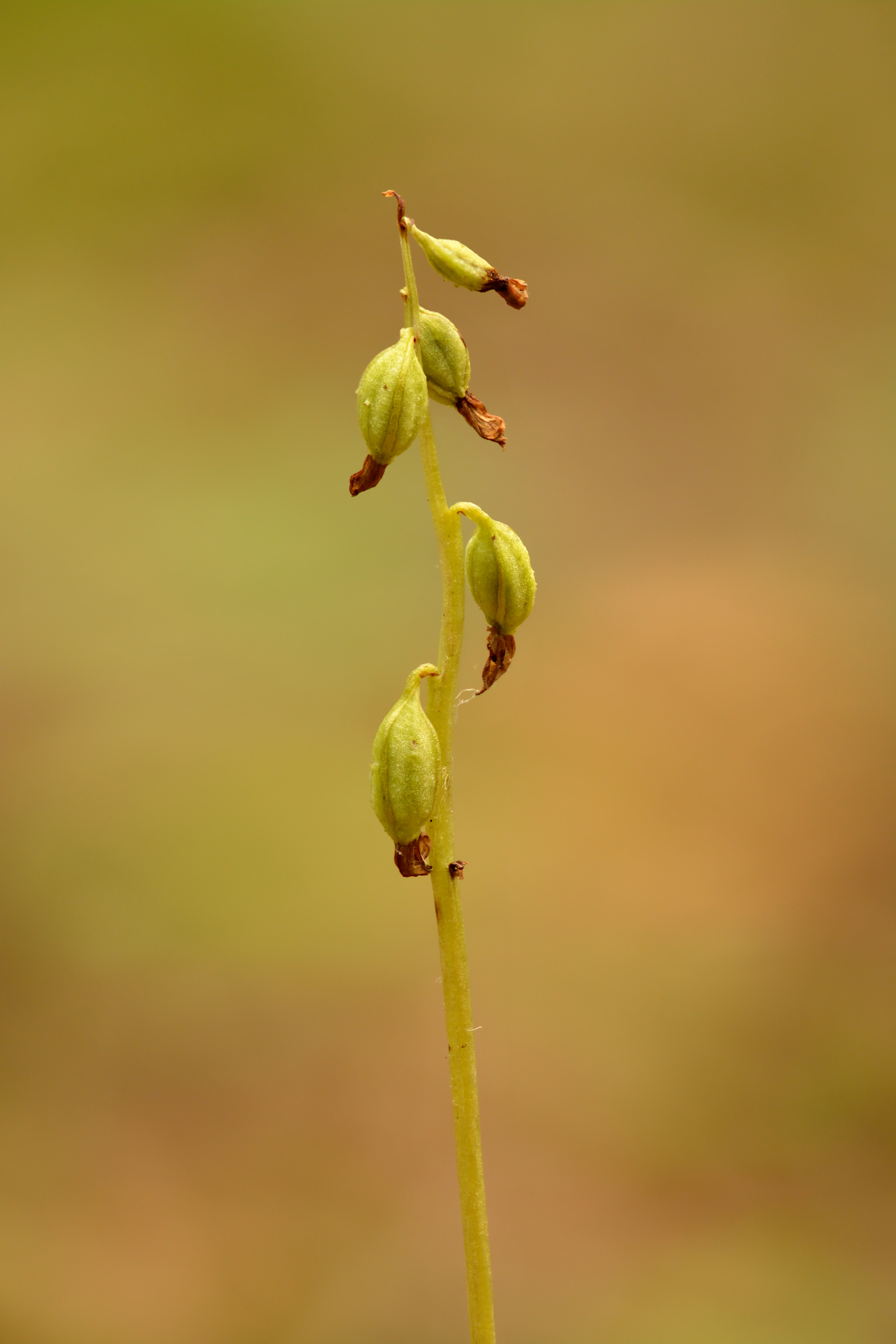
Infructescence
