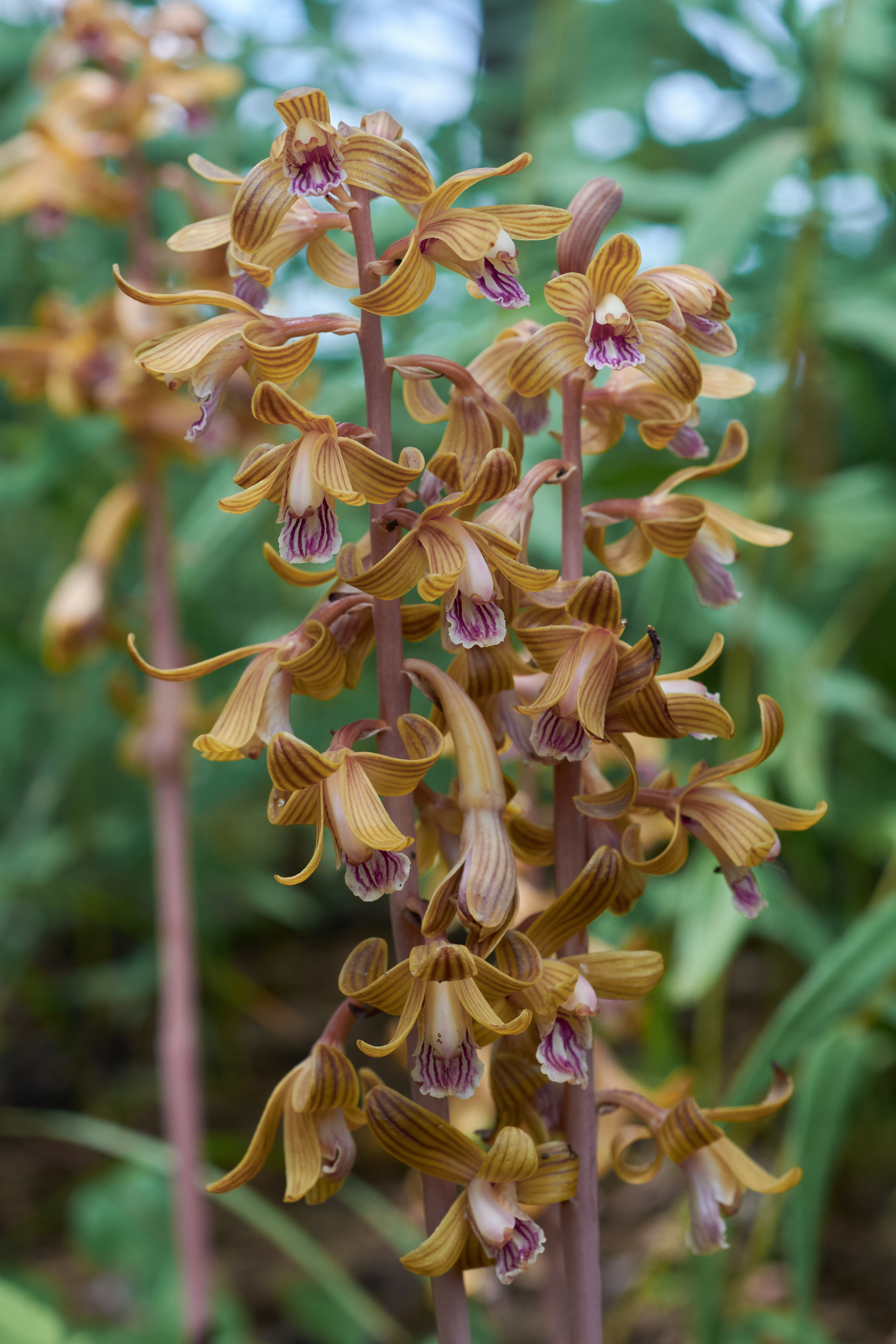

Scientific classification
- Kingdom: Plantae
- Clade: Tracheophytes
- Clade: Angiosperms
- Clade: Monocots
- Order: Asparagales
- Family: Orchidaceae
- Subfamily: Epidendroideae
- Genus: Hexalectris
- Species: H. spicata

Binomial name
- Hexalectris spicata (Walter) Barnhart

Synonyms
- Arethusa spicata Walter; Corallorhiza spicata (Walter) Tidestr.; Bletia aphylla Nutt.; Hexalectris aphylla (Nutt.) Raf.; Hexalectris squamosa Raf.; Hexalectris aphylla (Nutt.) A.Gray; Hexalectris spicata f. albolabia P.M.Br.; Hexalectris spicata f. lutea P.M.Br.; Hexalectris spicata f. wilderi P.M.Br.

= Hexalectris spicata =

Species of orchid

Hexalectris spicata, the spiked crested coralroot, is a terrestrial, myco-heterotrophic orchid lacking chlorophyll and subsisting entirely on nutrients obtained from mycorrhizal fungi in the soil. It is native to Arizona, New Mexico, Texas and Coahuila. It is closely related to H. arizonica and the two are sometimes considered varieties of the same species. Hexalectris spicata is endemic to the southern half of the United States from Arizona east to Florida and north to Maryland and the Ohio Valley.
