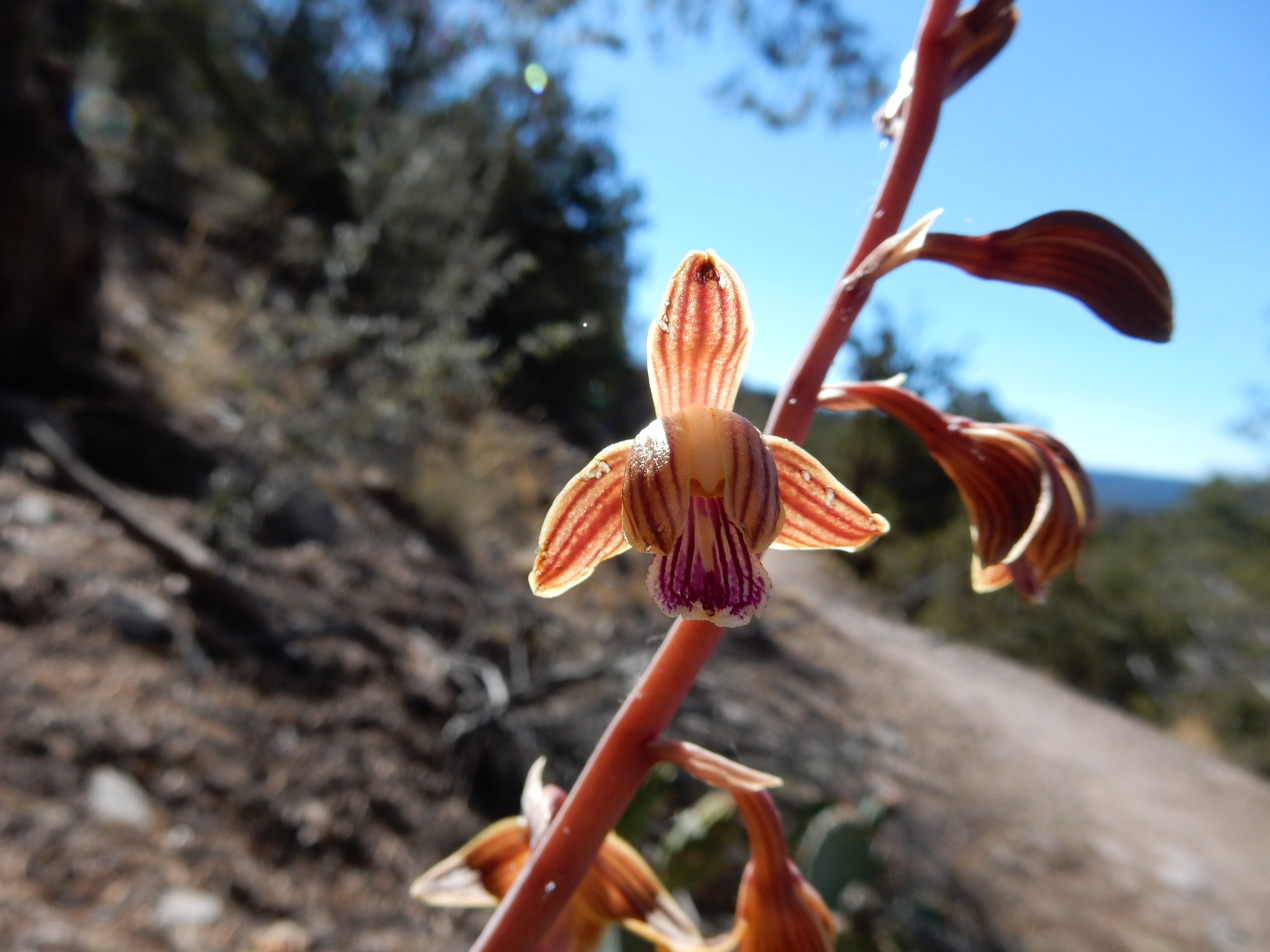

Scientific classification
- Kingdom: Plantae
- Clade: Tracheophytes
- Clade: Angiosperms
- Clade: Monocots
- Order: Asparagales
- Family: Orchidaceae
- Subfamily: Epidendroideae
- Genus: Hexalectris
- Species: H. arizonica

Binomial name
- Hexalectris arizonica (S.Watson) A.H.Kenn. & L.E.Watson

Synonyms
- Corallorhiza arizonica S.Watson; Hexalectris spicata var. arizonica (S.Watson) Catling & V.S.Engel

= Hexalectris arizonica =

Species of orchid

Hexalectris arizonica, the spiked crested coralroot or Arizona crested coralroot, is a terrestrial, myco-heterotrophic orchid lacking chlorophyll and subsisting entirely on nutrients obtained from mycorrhizal fungi in the soil. It is native to Arizona, New Mexico, Texas and Coahuila. It is closely related to H. spicata and sometimes regarded as a variety of that species.
