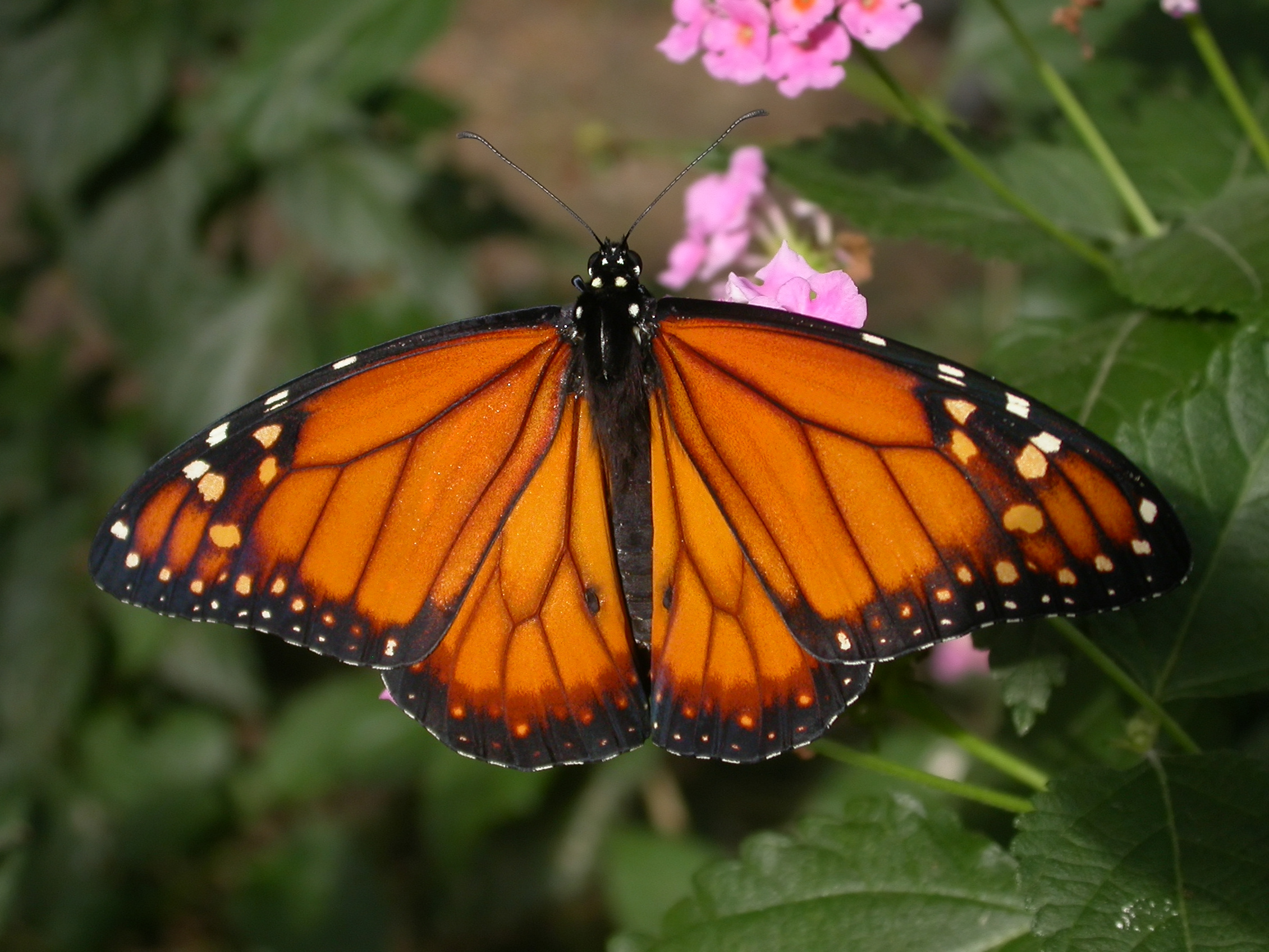
- Male, La Plata, Buenos Aires province, Argentina

Scientific classification
- Kingdom: Animalia
- Phylum: Arthropoda
- Clade: Pancrustacea
- Class: Insecta
- Order: Lepidoptera
- Family: Nymphalidae
- Genus: Danaus
- Species: D. erippus

Binomial name
- Danaus erippus (Cramer, [1775])

Synonyms
- Papilio erippus Cramer, 1775; Anosia erippe Hübner, 1816; Anosia synippe Hübner, 1821; Danais archippus var. brasiliensis Capronnier, 1874; Papilio vulgaris Larrañaga, 1923; Danais erippus ab. larensis Köhler, 1929

= Danaus erippus =

Southern monarch

Species of butterfly

Danaus erippus, the southern monarch, is a milkweed butterfly (subfamily Danainae) in the family Nymphalidae. It is one of the best known butterflies in South America. Its genome is nearly identical to D. plexippus, but the two are incompatible, and therefore considered separate species.

== Description ==
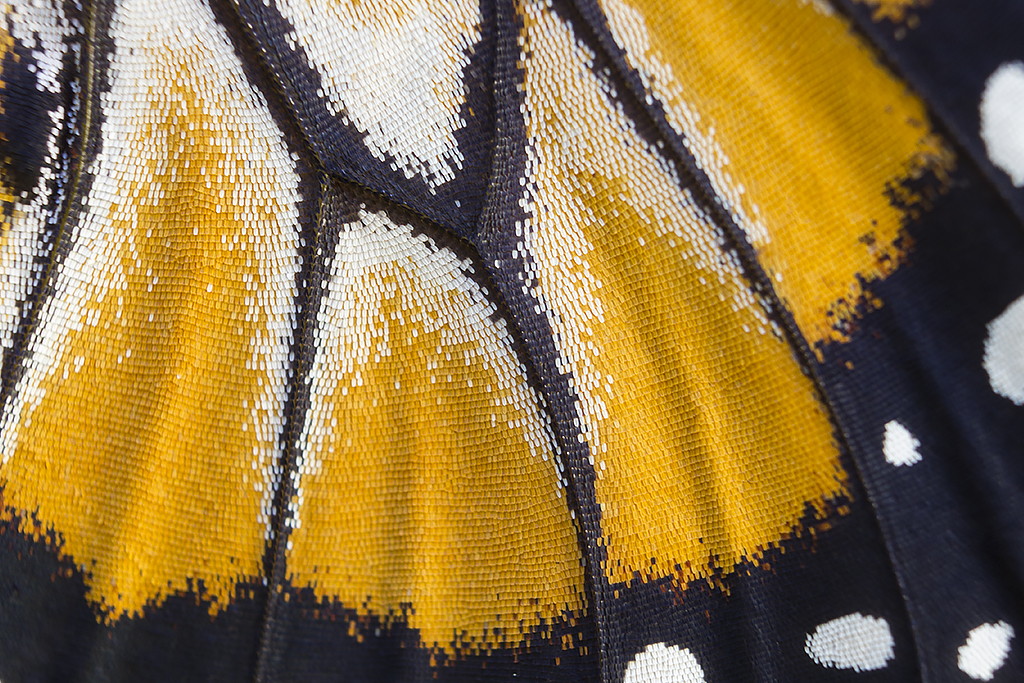
Close-up of wing scales.

Danaus erippus is included with other Nymphalidae, the largest family of butterflies with about 6000 species distributed throughout most of the world. It has a reduced pair of forelegs, is brightly coloured, and is included with popular species such as the emperors, admirals, tortoiseshells, and fritillaries. Its wingspan reaches about 110 millimetres (4.3 in), with an easily recognizable orange and black pattern. Until 2007, this butterfly was treated as a subspecies of Danaus plexippus. These species are very similar, but D. erippus usually has an orange trailing edge of the forewings, while in D. plexippus it is black. The lineages of the two species are thought to have separated about 2 million years ago. The colour of the wings in males of the southern monarch is paler than in the females.

== Migration ==
Though, not as well known as the eastern North American monarch migratory phenomenon, it has been observed to move in a consistent spring/autumn manner by flying south in the autumn towards colder latitudes for the winter. Massive overwintering roosts have not yet been found.

== Larval food plants ==
D. erippus, like D. plexippus, utilizes host plants that in the genus Asclepias including A. barjoniifolia, A. boliviensis, and A. curassavica, as well as some non-Asclepias (e.g., Astephanus geminiflorus, Cynanchum boerhaviifolium, Cynanchum atacamense, and Tweedia birostrata).

== Distribution ==
This species can be found in tropical and subtropical latitudes of South America, mainly in Brazil, Uruguay, Paraguay, Argentina, Bolivia, Chile, and southern Peru.

== Gallery ==
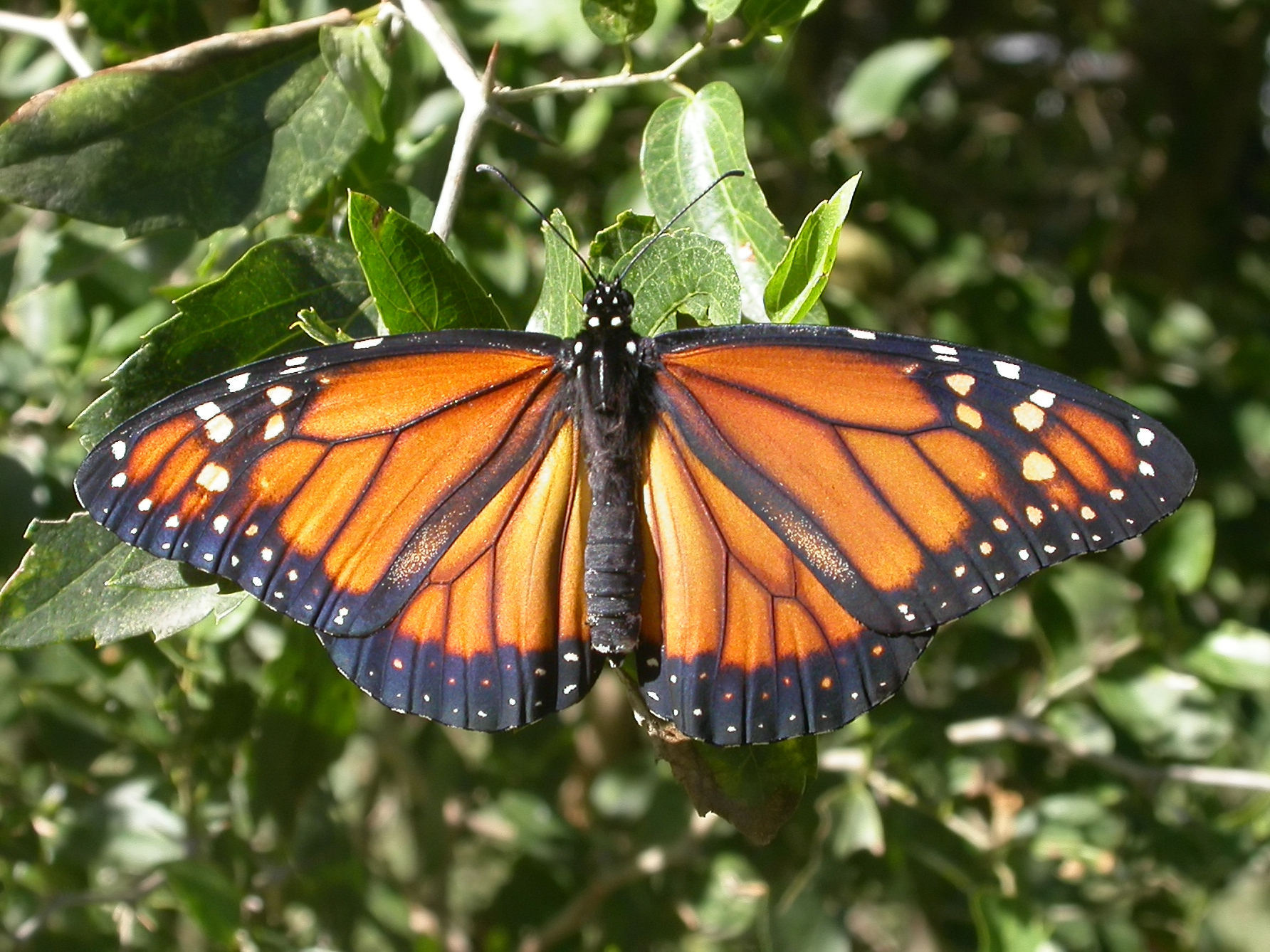
Female

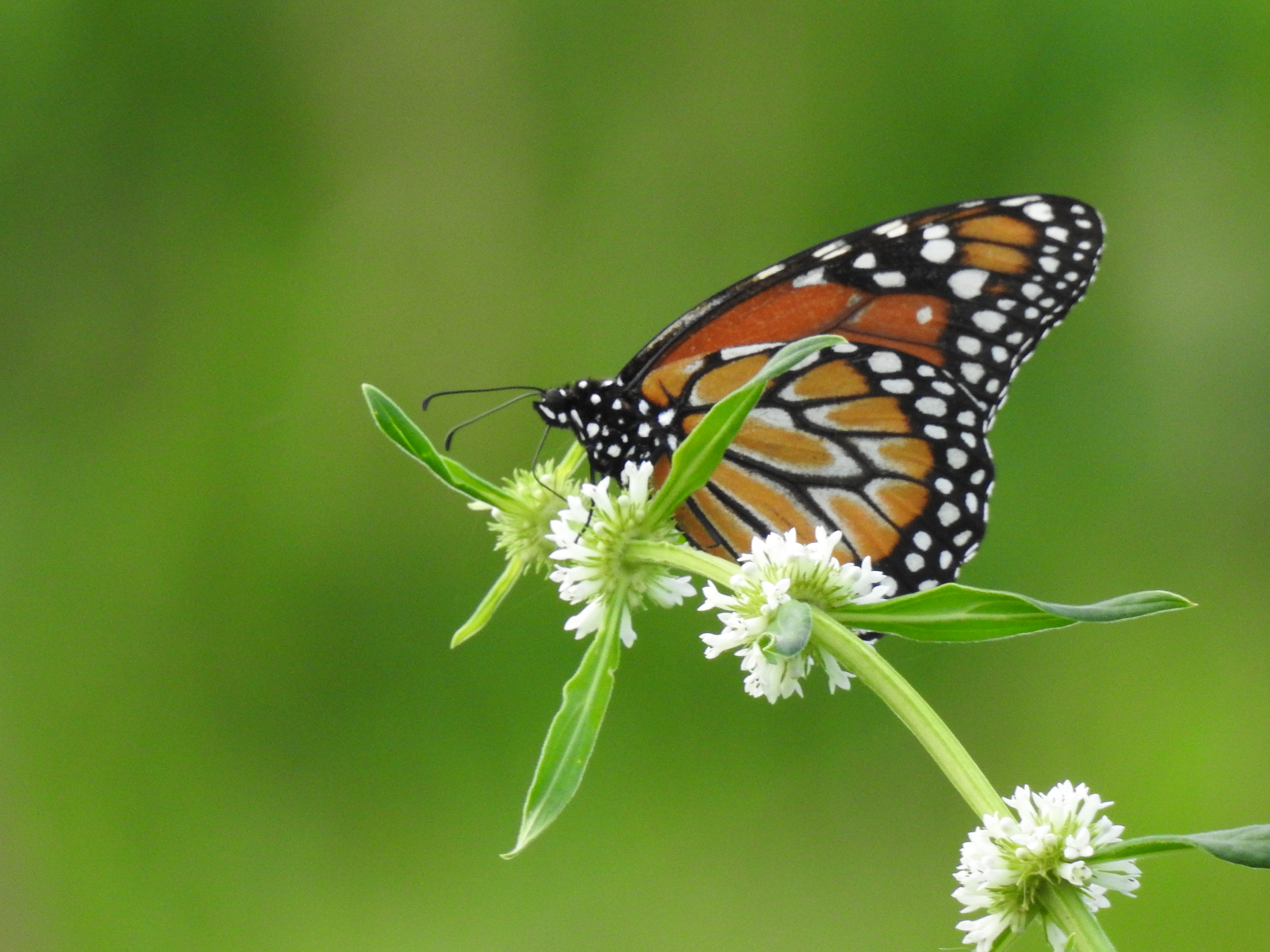
Underside

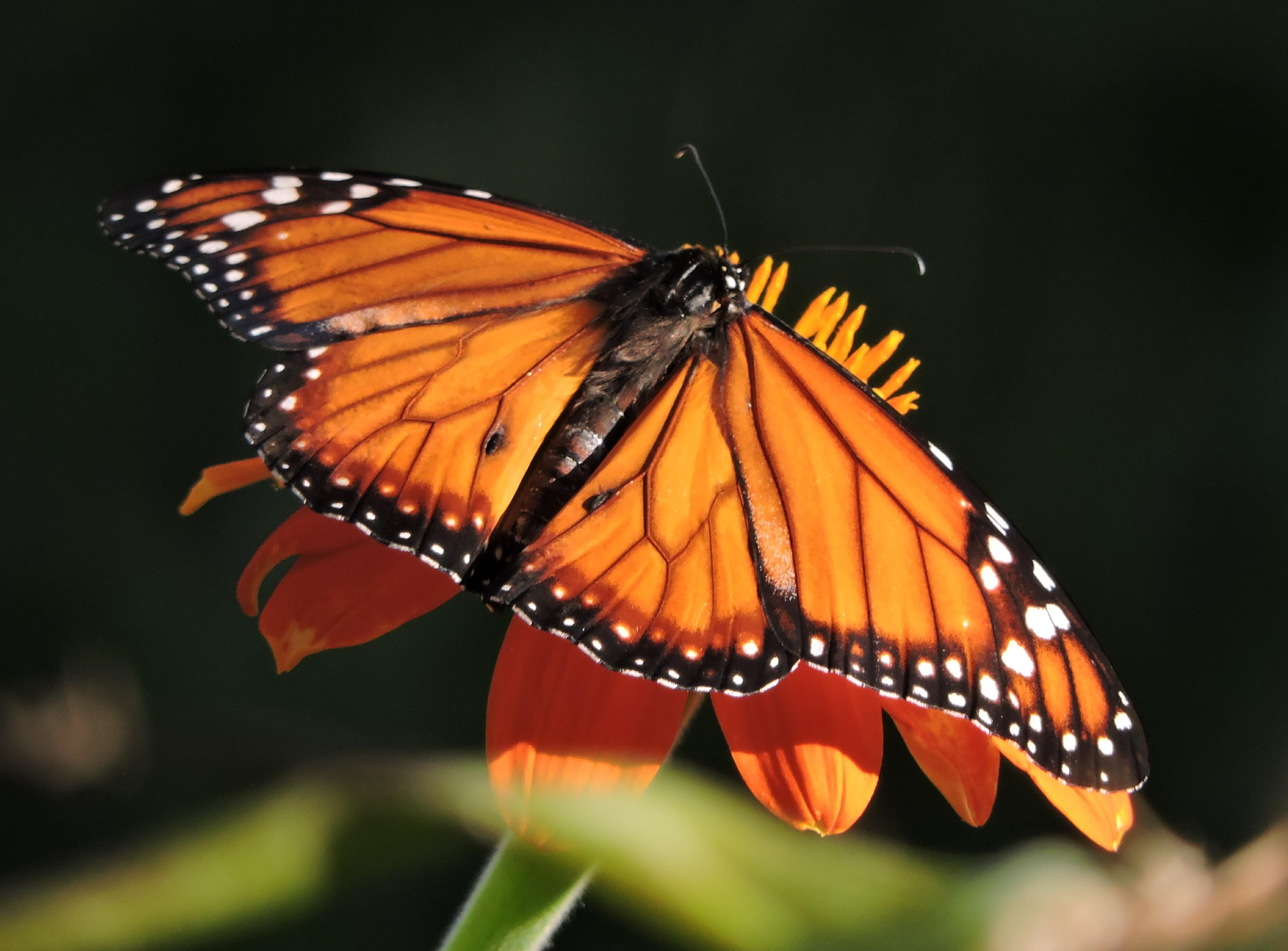
Male

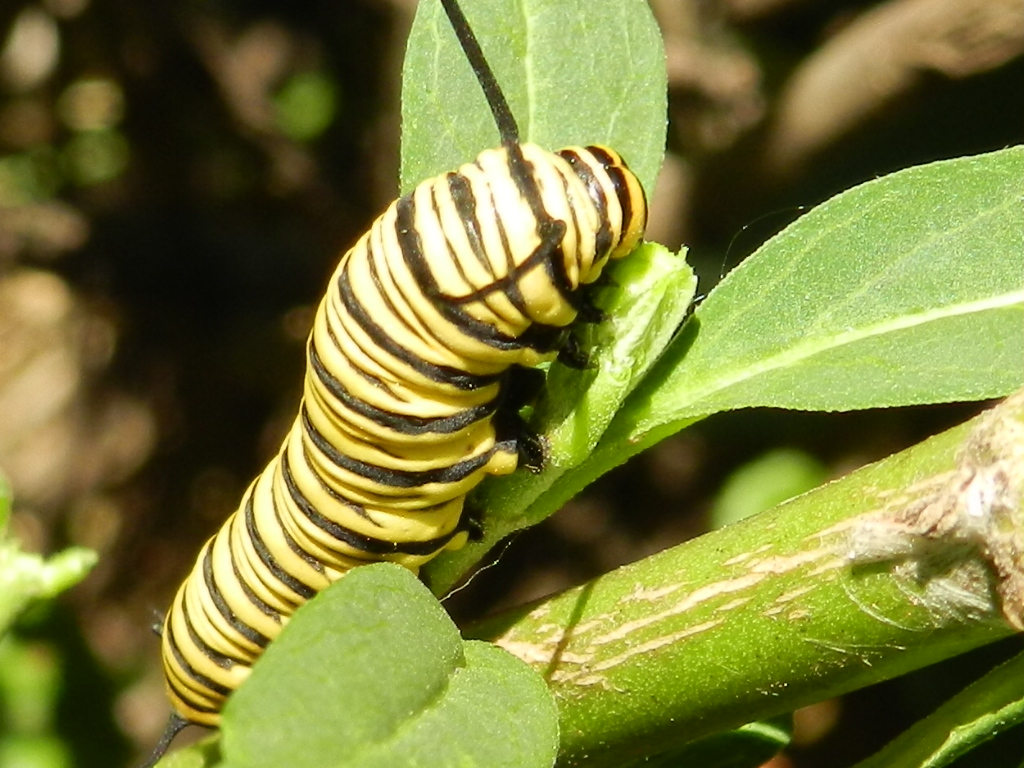
Larva

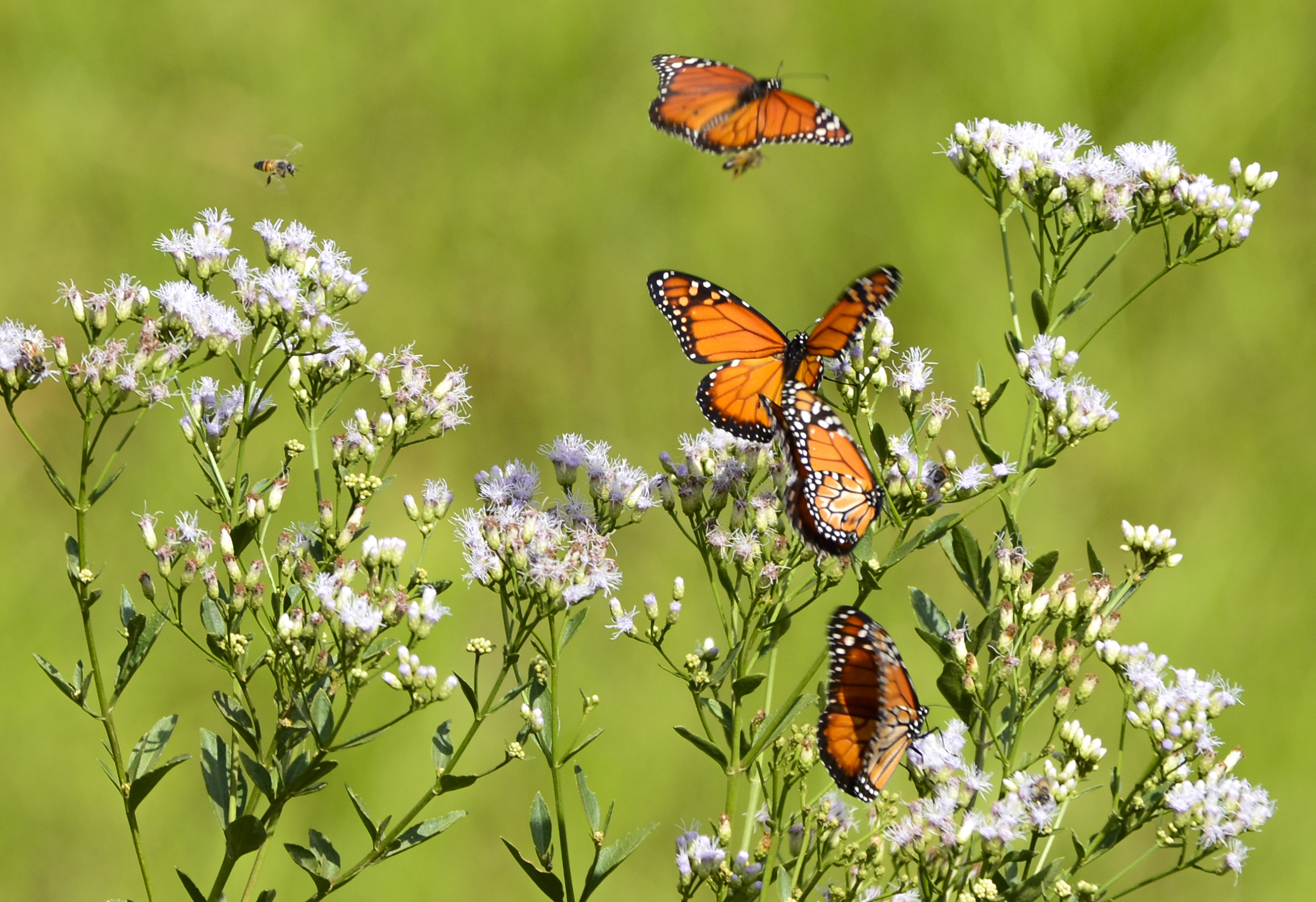
