= Solanoa =

Solanoa may refer to:

- Asclepias solanoana — a plant species, for which "solanoa" is one of several of its common names
- Asclepias — the genus for the above; and for which "Solanoa" is one of several of its synonyms
