= Horsetail milkweed =

Horsetail milkweed is a common name for several plants and may refer to:

- Asclepias subverticillata
- Asclepias verticillata
