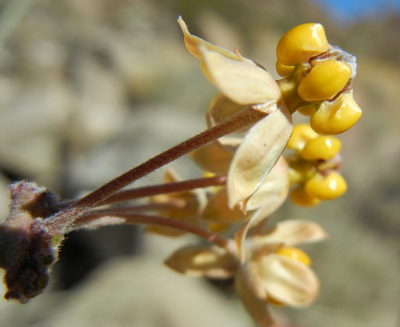

Conservation status
- Secure (NatureServe)

Scientific classification
- Kingdom: Plantae
- Clade: Embryophytes
- Clade: Tracheophytes
- Clade: Spermatophytes
- Clade: Angiosperms
- Clade: Eudicots
- Clade: Asterids
- Order: Gentianales
- Family: Apocynaceae
- Genus: Asclepias
- Species: A. albicans

Binomial name
- Asclepias albicans S.Watson

= Asclepias albicans =

Species of flowering plant

Asclepias albicans is a species of milkweed known by the common names whitestem milkweed and wax milkweed. It is native to the Mojave and Sonoran Deserts of California, Arizona, and Baja California. This is a spindly erect shrub usually growing 1 to 3 meters (3 1/2 to 10 feet) tall, but known to approach 4 metres (13 feet). The sticklike branches are mostly naked, the younger ones coated in a waxy residue and a thin layer of woolly hairs. The leaves are ephemeral, growing in whorls of three on the lower branches and falling off after a short time. They are linear in shape and up to 3 centimeters (1 1/4 inches) long. The inflorescence is an umbel about 5 cm (2 in) wide which appears at the tips of the long branches and sprouting from the sides at nodes. The inflorescence contains many purple-tinted greenish flowers, each about 1.5 cm (1/2 in) wide, with a central array of bulbous hoods, and corollas reflexed back against the stalk. In its native range it is an evergreen perennial. The plant usually blooms all year long. The fruit is a large, long, thick follicle which dangles from the branch nodes. It grows in dry, rocky places in the desert.

Asclepias albicans is a larval host for the monarch butterfly and the queen butterfly.

The similar A. subulata is found in similar regions.
