= Asclepias pilgeriana =

Scientific classification
- Kingdom: Plantae
- Clade: Tracheophytes
- Clade: Angiosperms
- Clade: Eudicots
- Clade: Asterids
- Order: Gentianales
- Family: Apocynaceae
- Genus: Asclepias
- Species: A. pilgeriana

Binomial name
- Asclepias pilgeriana Schltr.

Synonyms
- Asclepias campestris var. flava Kuntze; Asclepias campestris var. heterophylla Kuntze; Asclepias flava Lillo

Species of flowering plant

Asclepias pilgeriana is a species of flowering plant in the genus Asclepias and family Apocynaceae. It grows in Argentina and Bolivia. It lives in desert and dry shurbland habitats. It is a host plant for the Southern monarch butterfly.

== See alsi ==
- List of Asclepias species
