= Romerillo =

Romerillo is a common name of Spanish origin for several plants and may refer to:

- Abies guatemalensis, native to Central America
- Asclepias linaria
- Baccharis sarothroides
- Bidens alba
- Podocarpus glomeratus, native to Bolivia, Ecuador, and Peru
- Suaeda nigra
