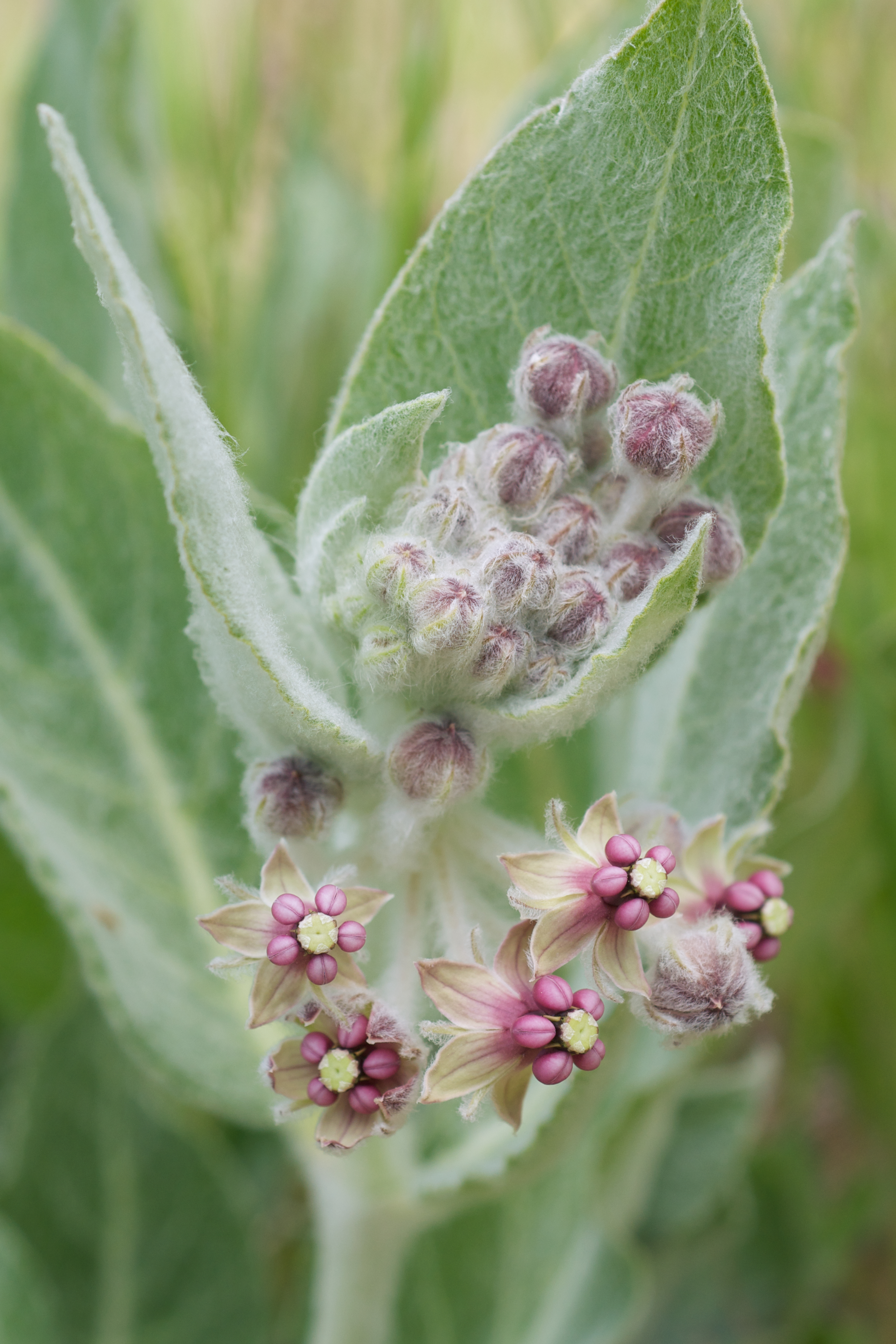

Conservation status
- Secure (NatureServe)

Scientific classification
- Kingdom: Plantae
- Clade: Embryophytes
- Clade: Tracheophytes
- Clade: Angiosperms
- Clade: Eudicots
- Clade: Asterids
- Order: Gentianales
- Family: Apocynaceae
- Genus: Asclepias
- Species: A. californica

Binomial name
- Asclepias californica Greene

= Asclepias californica =

Species of flowering plant

Asclepias californica is a species of milkweed known by the common name California milkweed. It grows throughout lower northern, central and southern California.

== Description ==
Asclepias californica is native to California and northern Baja California. It is a flowering perennial with thick, white, woolly stems which bend or run along the ground. The plentiful, hanging flowers are rounded structures with reflexed corollas and starlike arrays of bulbous anthers.

As for size and structure, the Asclepias californica grows 1 to 3 feet tall with a stout, erect stem. Its leaves are long, lance-shaped with a waxy texture. The plant's grey-green color aids in reducing water loss. Asclepias californica feature clustered pink and purple flowers that attract pollinators as well as large, elongated seed pods with silky fibers for wind dispersal.

== Geographic Range & Distribution ==
Asclepias californica is frequently found in dry, sloping areas at elevations of 600 to 7,000 feet (182 to 2,134 meters). The wide elevation range indicates Asclepias californica is able to survive with varying temperature and precipitation levels, contributing to its broad distribution in California and Baja California. Additional habitats this plant thrives in include coastal sage scrub and chaparral. Both of which are characterized by low rainfall and well-drained soils. This plant favors soils that are well-drained yet retain moderate moisture.

== Taxonomy ==
Asclepias californica belongs to the Asclepias genus in the Apocynaceae family. This species is closely related to others in the Asclepias genus, including Asclepias fasciculalris.

== Ecology & butterfly interactions ==
Asclepias californica is an important monarch butterfly caterpillar host plant, and chrysalis habitat plant. The cardiac glycosides caterpillars ingest from the plant are retained in the butterfly, making it unpalatable to predators. Asclepias californica attracts a wide variety of pollinators including bees and other butterfly species. Its flowers are rich in nectar, providing a critical food source for various insects as well as serving as shelter; contributing greatly to the overall pollinator health in the region.

== Uses ==
This plant was eaten as candy by the Kawaiisu tribes of indigenous California; the milky sap within the leaves is flavorful and chewy when cooked, but can be poisonous when raw.

== Conservation status ==
Although not currently classified as endangered, its populations are threatened by habitat destruction from urban expansion and climate change. Conservation efforts are necessary to protect and restore its natural habitats.
