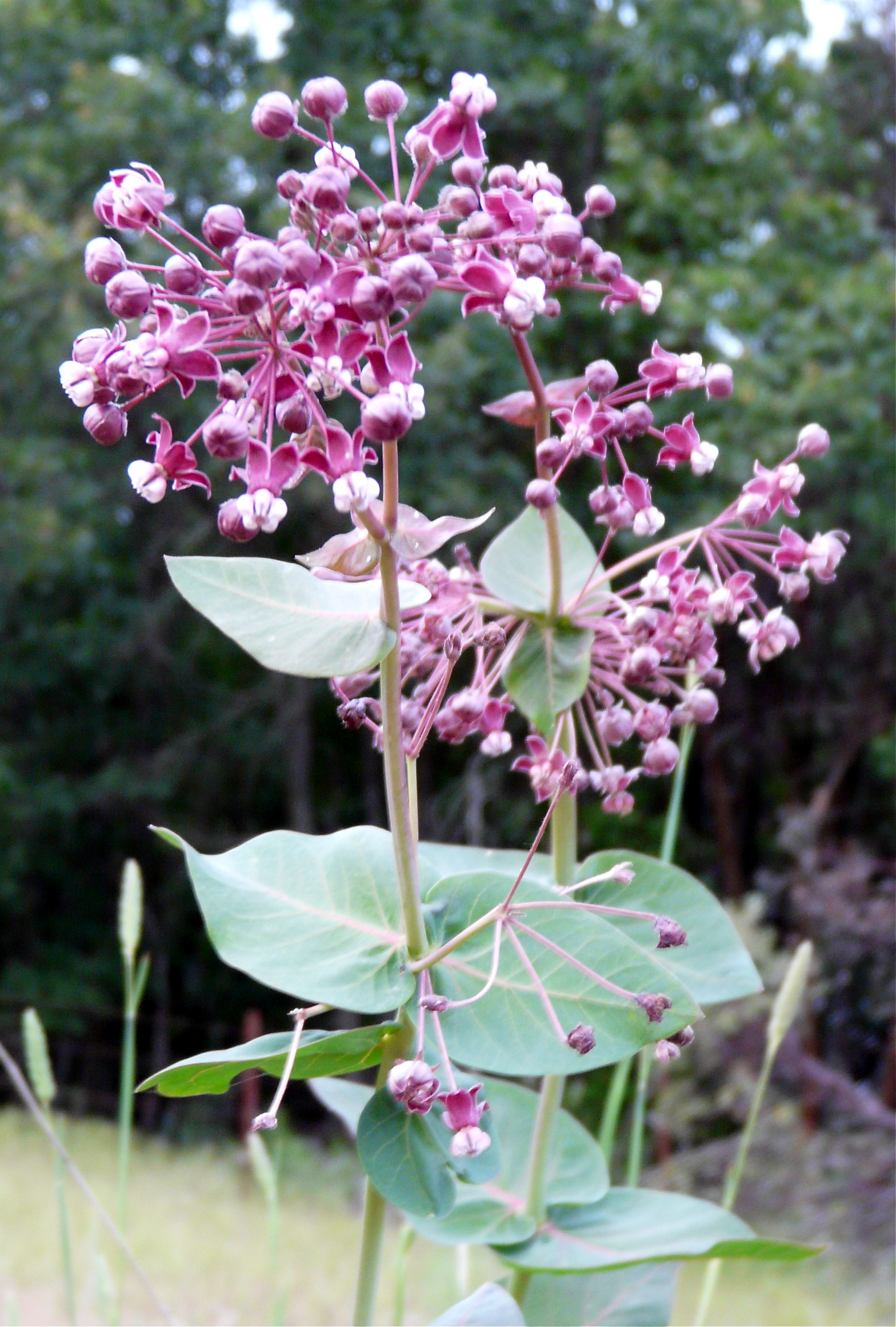

Conservation status
- Secure (NatureServe)

Scientific classification
- Kingdom: Plantae
- Clade: Embryophytes
- Clade: Tracheophytes
- Clade: Angiosperms
- Clade: Eudicots
- Clade: Asterids
- Order: Gentianales
- Family: Apocynaceae
- Genus: Asclepias
- Species: A. cordifolia

Binomial name
- Asclepias cordifolia (Benth.) Jeps.

= Asclepias cordifolia =

Species of flowering plant

Asclepias cordifolia is a species of milkweed commonly called heart-leaf milkweed or purple milkweed (a common name shared with another milkweed, Asclepias purpurascens). It is native to the western United States (California, Nevada, Oregon), growing between 50 and 2,000 m (160 and 6,560 ft) elevation in the northern Sierra Nevada and Cascade ranges. Heart-leaf milkweed was valued by the Native American Miwok tribe for its stems, which they dried and processed into string and rope.

== Description ==
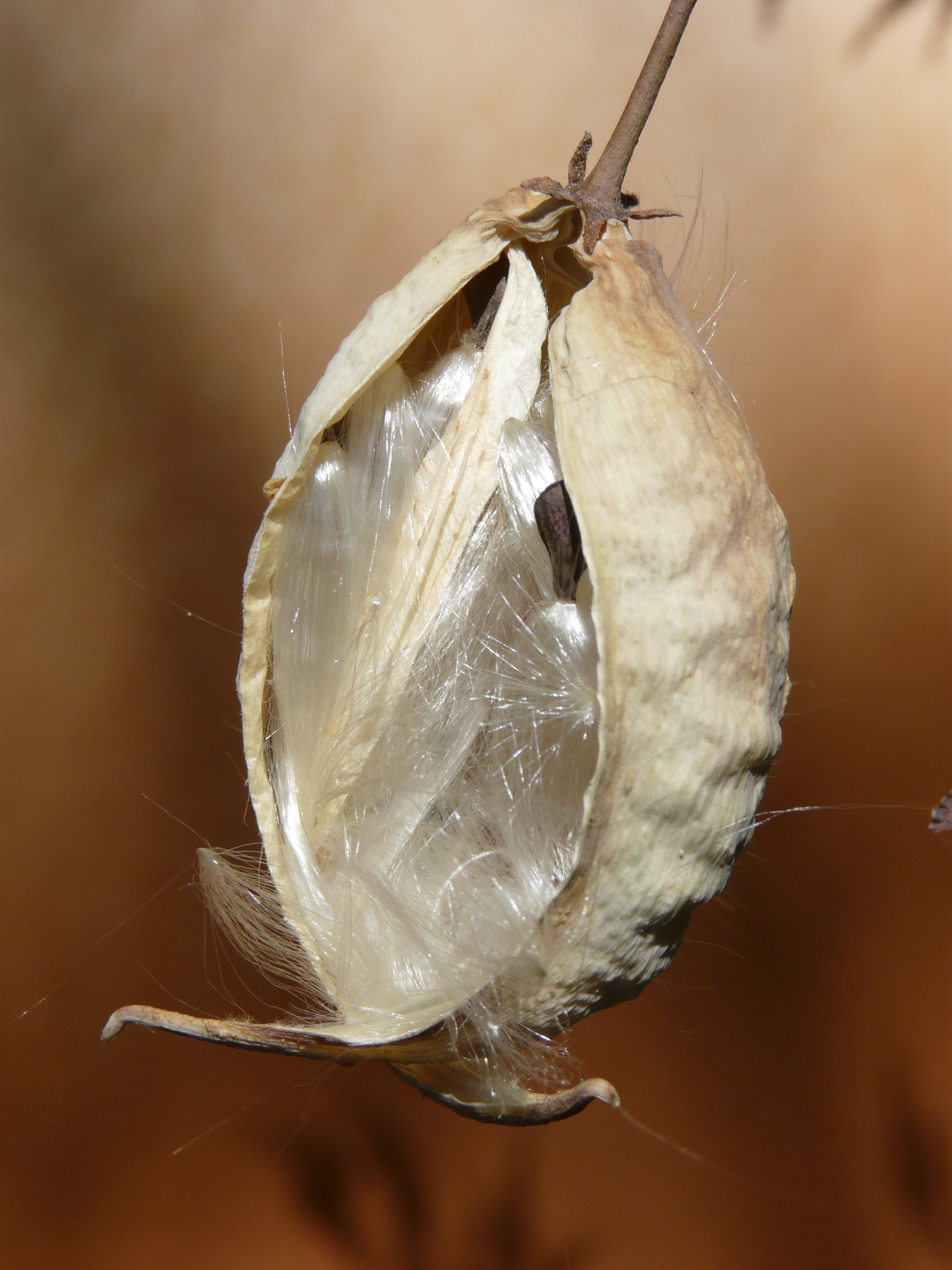
Asclepias cordifolia follicle

Heart-leaf milkweed is a perennial that grows to a height of 0.3 to 0.6 m (1 to 2 ft), with dark red-purple flowers whose hoods are slightly elevated above the base of the corolla. The flower structure is unusual—it has five stamens fused into a column, with five circular attachments called 'hoods', and an anther head surrounding the large stigma at the flower's center. The fruit (photo at left) is a follicle with many flat seeds that have silky hairs which disperse easily in the wind. The large opposite leaves are cordate, or heart-shaped. The plant grows in open or shaded woodland, often on rocky slopes and in mixed coniferous forest. The milkweeds are named for the milky sap which exudes from the plant's stem.

It blooms from May to July.

== Taxonomy ==
The species name, cordifolia (Latin for 'heart-leaved'), refers to the heart-shaped leaves, while the genus name honors the Greek physician Asclepius.

== Ecology ==
Monarch butterfly caterpillars are commonly found on all the milkweeds, including the heart-leaf milkweed. Even after the caterpillar has metamorphosed into a butterfly, the alkaloids they ingest from the plant are retained in the butterfly, making it unpalatable to predators.

== Uses ==
The Miwok gathered heart-leaf milkweed in the summer and dried it, or collected it in the fall [autumn, most likely between September and December) after it was already dry. The dry stems were combed with a loop of willow to draw out the fiber just beneath the very thin outer skin. The fiber was wound into balls for storage and later processing. The making of cordage (rope and string) was done entirely by hand, with no tools. Asclepias was also used by the Native American Yokuts or Mariposa in northern and central California for string or rope.

A single Miwok feather skirt or cape was made with approximately 100 feet of cordage, requiring about 500 plant stalks. A 40-foot-long deer net contained about 7,000 feet of cordage, requiring the harvesting of approximately 35,000 plant stalks. The milkweed stalks were burned in the fall to eliminate dead stalks and stimulate the next year's growth, and to stimulate flower and seed production. Cordage was typically two-ply, though there are some examples at the Field Museum of three- and four-ply Miwok cordage.

Heart-leaf milkweed was also used as a contraceptive and snakebite remedy, though without proper preparation it can cause vomiting in low doses and death in higher doses due to a mix of cardenolides in the sap. At one time it was classified as a noxious weed because of reported negative effects on livestock.
