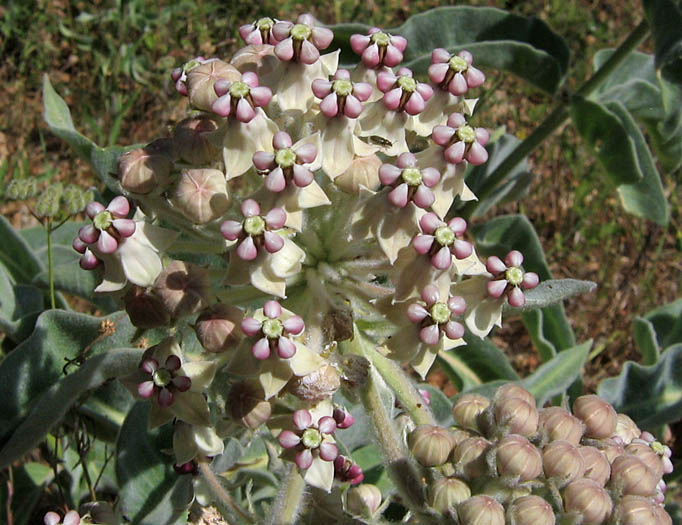

Conservation status
- Secure (NatureServe)

Scientific classification
- Kingdom: Plantae
- Clade: Tracheophytes
- Clade: Angiosperms
- Clade: Eudicots
- Clade: Asterids
- Order: Gentianales
- Family: Apocynaceae
- Genus: Asclepias
- Species: A. eriocarpa

Binomial name
- Asclepias eriocarpa Benth.

Synonyms
- Asclepias fremontii

= Asclepias eriocarpa =

Species of flowering plant

Asclepias eriocarpa is a species of milkweed known by the common names woollypod milkweed, Indian milkweed, and kotolo. It is a perennial herb that grows in many types of habitats.

== Description ==
Asclepias eriocarpa is an erect perennial herb which is usually coated in a thick layer of white hairs. The leaves are lance-shaped to oval, rippled, and arranged oppositely in pairs or in whorls of 3 or 4. The inflorescence is a large umbel-like cluster of flowers. Each flower is white to cream and usually tinted with bright pink. It has a central array of rounded hoods and a corolla reflexed against the stalk. The fruit is a large, woolly follicle. Flowers bloom May to October.

== Distribution and habitat ==
Asclepias eriocarpa is native to California and adjacent parts of Nevada and Baja California. It grows in many habitat types such as rocky hillsides, woods, deserts, and especially dry areas.

== Uses ==
Several Californian Indigenous groups, including the Ohlone and Luiseño, used this plant as a source of fiber and medicine. The Concow tribe calls the plant bō'-kō (Konkow language).

== Ecology ==
Asclepias eriocarpa is a specific monarch butterfly food and habitat plant. It is one of the most poisonous milkweeds. Natural History July/August 2015 calls it the most poisonous, but most sources put it below A. lancifolia (now known as Asclepias perennis).
