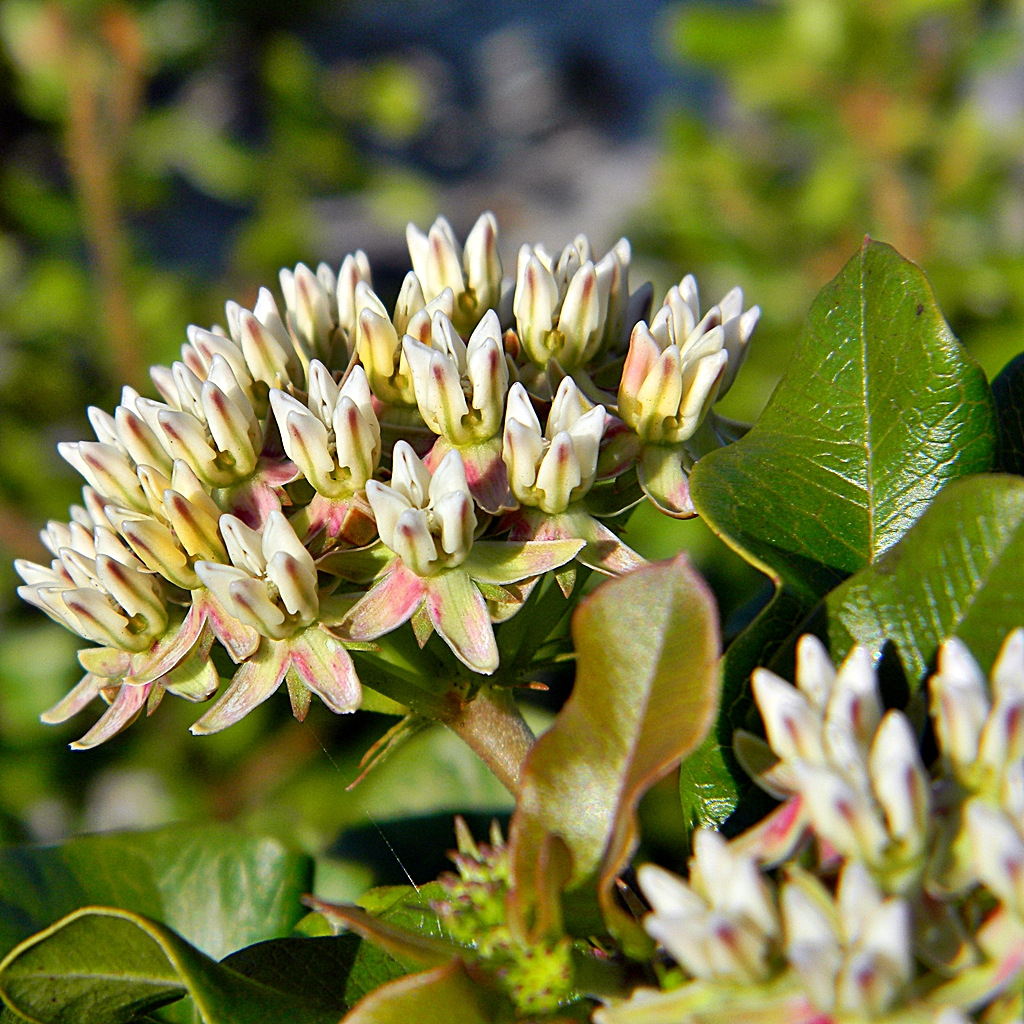

Conservation status
- Vulnerable (NatureServe)

Scientific classification
- Kingdom: Plantae
- Clade: Embryophytes
- Clade: Tracheophytes
- Clade: Spermatophytes
- Clade: Angiosperms
- Clade: Eudicots
- Clade: Asterids
- Order: Gentianales
- Family: Apocynaceae
- Genus: Asclepias
- Species: A. curtissii

Binomial name
- Asclepias curtissii A. Gray

= Asclepias curtissii =

Curtiss's milkweed

Species of plant

Asclepias curtissii, or Curtiss's milkweed, is a rare species of flowering milkweed that is endemic to Florida's sandy areas. Curtiss's milkweed belongs to the subfamily Asclepiadoideae and the genus Asclepias. This dicotyledonous, perennial plant was placed on the endangered species list by the state of Florida to protect this rare milkweed. Although Curtiss milkweed is found all over Florida, the populations are very isolated and concentrated.

== Description ==
Curtiss's milkweed is a deciduous plant that can become very tall and lanky, reaching up to 2–4 feet tall. The leaves of Asclepias curtissii are large, elliptical, and dark green in color and usually have a noticeable undulating edge. The flower of this plant bloom in the summer months. The flower heads (umbels) of this plant are few and are usually located on the ends of the main stalks and consist of about 20–30 individual flowers, which are a bright white when they bloom.

== Ecology ==
The sap of Asclepias curtissii contains cardenolides which are toxic to vertebrates in high quantities. Despite this deer are the main consumers of Curtiss's milkweed, followed up by grasshoppers removing some flowers. Many insect larvae use Curtiss's milkweed as a shelter for the early part of their lives, as well as providing food for these larvae. Although Asclepias curtissii isn't usually associated with monarch butterflies as a food source, monarchs can feed off of it and will if the need arises.

== Habitat ==
Curtiss's milkweed lives in the excessively drained parts of Florida. Asclepias curtissii is usually found with other plants including Florida rosemary (Ceratiola ericoides), Chapman oak (Quercus chapmanii), myrtle oak (Quercus myrtifolia), and sand live oak (Quercus geminata), amongst other plants. Curtiss's milkweed has a very high tolerance for soil disturbance, often being found along the edges of fire lanes and sand roads.

== Reproduction ==
The spread out population of this milkweed proposes a problem, mainly pollination, but Curtiss's milkweed has specialized flowers that only allow certain insects – that seek out this plant – to pollinate it. These insects include skipper butterflies and hairstreaks, which were found in abundance on the flowers of Asclepias curtissii.
