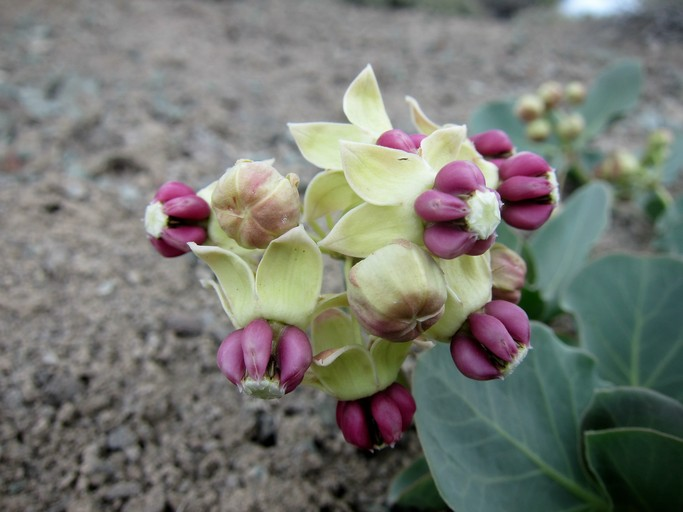

Conservation status
- Apparently Secure (NatureServe)

Scientific classification
- Kingdom: Plantae
- Clade: Tracheophytes
- Clade: Angiosperms
- Clade: Eudicots
- Clade: Asterids
- Order: Gentianales
- Family: Apocynaceae
- Genus: Asclepias
- Species: A. cryptoceras

Binomial name
- Asclepias cryptoceras S.Watson

= Asclepias cryptoceras =

Species of plant

Asclepias cryptoceras is a species of milkweed known by the common names jewel milkweed, pallid milkweed, Humboldt Mountains milkweed, and cow-cabbage. It is native to the Great Basin of western North America, where it grows in many types of habitat, especially dry areas. This is a perennial herb growing low against the ground or drooping. It arises from a fleshy, woody rhizome-like root. The thick leaves are round to heart-shaped and arranged oppositely on the short stem. The inflorescence is a cluster of small flowers with centers of bright to dull pink hoods surrounded by pale-colored reflexed corollas. The fruit is a follicle held erect on a small stalk.

The Northern Paiute used the plant as a medicinal remedy, preparing the roots for headache and sores, and the latex for ringworm.
