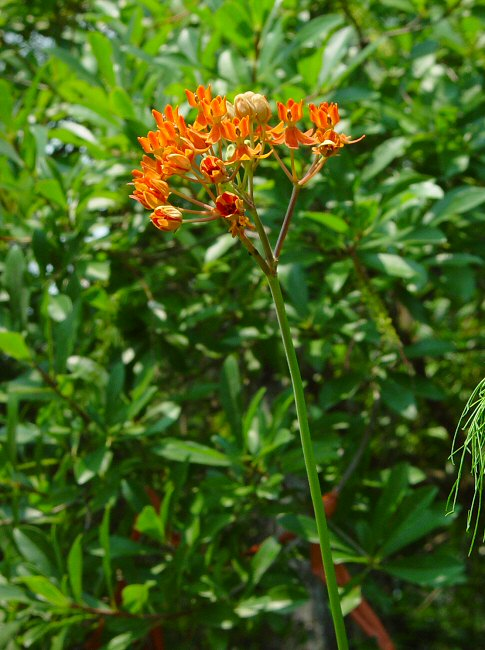

Scientific classification
- Kingdom: Plantae
- Clade: Tracheophytes
- Clade: Angiosperms
- Clade: Eudicots
- Clade: Asterids
- Order: Gentianales
- Family: Apocynaceae
- Genus: Asclepias
- Species: A. lanceolata

Binomial name
- Asclepias lanceolata Walter

= Asclepias lanceolata =

Species of plant

Asclepias lanceolata, the fewflower milkweed, is a species of milkweed that is native to the coastal plain of the United States from New Jersey to Florida and Southeast Texas. A. lanceolata is an upright, perennial plant that can grow between 3 and 5 feet tall, with red-orange flowers blooming in the summer months. It can also be referred to as Cedar Hill milkweed, as it was first described by Dr. Eli Ives in the neighborhood of Cedar Hill in New Haven, Connecticut.

== Distribution ==
Asclepias lanceolata is found on the coastal plains of Eastern and Southeastern United States. Populations of this milkweed are found in the following states: Alabama, Delaware, Florida, Georgia, Louisiana, Maryland, Mississippi, North Carolina, New Jersey, South Carolina, Tennessee, Texas, and Virginia. It is distributed throughout most of Florida but only found in small areas of southeast Texas. Further details on state county distributions can be found on the USDA's plant profile for this species. A. lanceolata is on display at the Crosby Arboretum in Picayune, Mississippi.

== Habitat and ecology ==
Fewflower milkweed is a perennial plant that can be frequently found in marshes (fresh and brackish), low glades, and wet pine barrens. It prefers sandy and loamy soils that are well-drained, but can also survive in poorly drained swampy soils. Optimum soil pH is between 5 and 7, however it can grow within a range of 4.5 to 7.5. While it can grow in semi-shaded areas, it prefers a sunny site. A. lanceolata is adapted to a precipitation zone that ranges from 500 to 1500 mm annually, and a temperature that ranges from 8 to 35 degrees Celsius. Optimum precipitation range is 600 to 1400 mm per year, and optimum temperate ranges from 12 to 30 degrees Celsius. This milkweed can withstand winter temperatures down to -25 degrees Celsius. In the wild, it is often found growing near Salt Marsh Mallow, Kosteletzkya virginica. This plant is susceptible to damage by slugs, especially when it is young and vulnerable.

== Morphology ==
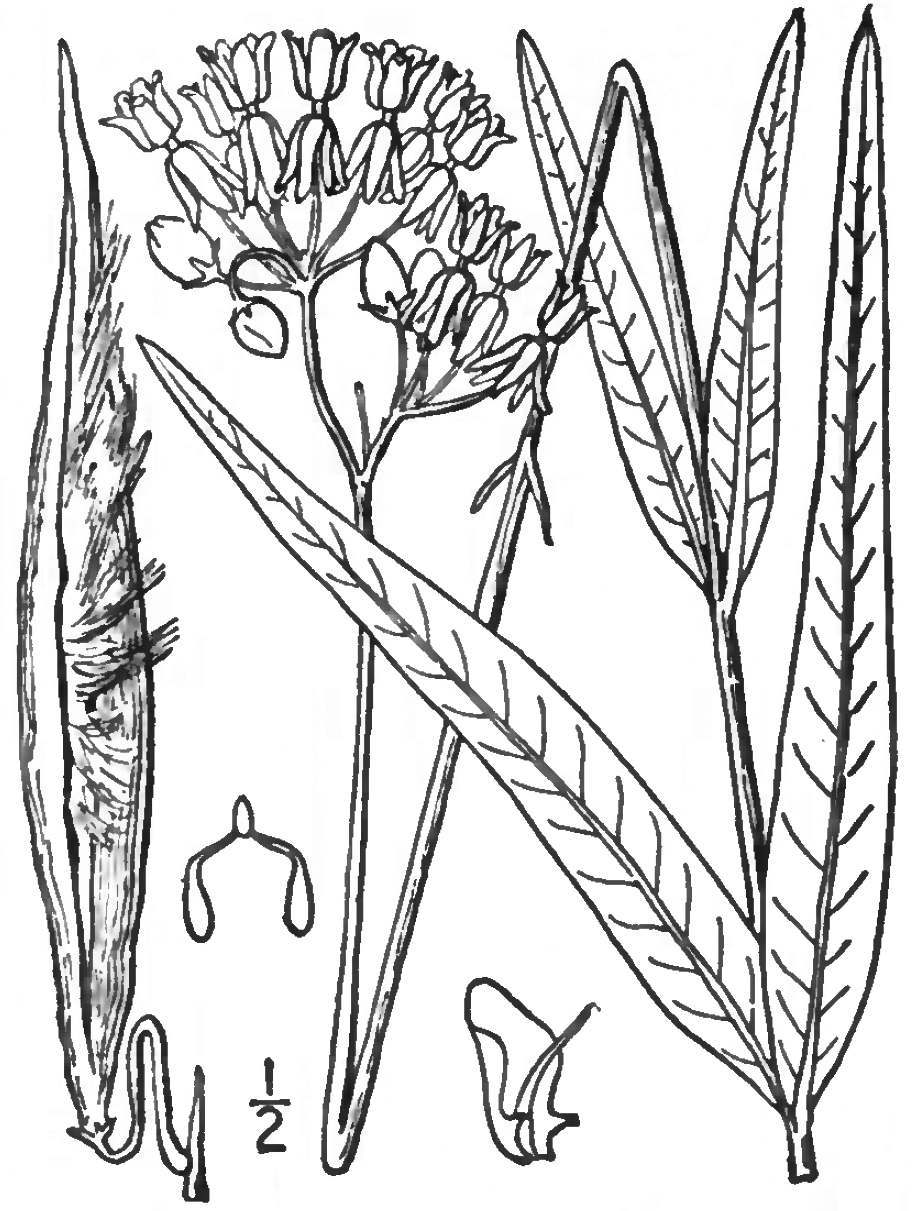
Illustration of leaves and flowers.

Individuals of this species grow upright to a height between 3 and 5 feet in an herb growth pattern. Leaves are oppositely arranged and are lanceolate shaped with an acuminate apex. The leaves can grow to 10 cm in length. The stem branches near the top to form 1 to 3 umbels, each containing an average of seven red-orange flowers. Most members of the genus Asclepias have more flowers than seen in this species, hence its common name fewflower milkweed. During the winter months, this plant is completely deciduous and barely noticeable when not flowering.

== Flowers and fruit ==
Flowers of Asclepias lanceolata are bright red-orange and can reach up to 1 cm wide. They first bloom in the early summer months of May and June and continue into July and August. The flowers are bisexual, having both male and female reproductive structures. They have five sepals, five petals, and exhibit actinomorphic (radial) symmetry. Fruits of this species are described as slender pods or follicles containing tiny seeds. The seeds ripen in September and have tiny hairs that aid in wind dispersal.

=== Pollination ===
Individuals of this species can outbreed or self-fertilize, and pollinators play a very important role in their life cycle. This species is pollinated by bees, insects, and members of Lepidoptera. It serves as a host plant for larvae of monarch, queen, and soldier butterflies (Danaus plexippus, Danaus gilippus, and Danaus eresimus, respectively). It also serves as a source of nectar for adult butterflies and insects. Researchers have concluded that A. lanceolata provides a high-quality nectar resource for its pollinating helpers.

== Usage ==
While this species of milkweed is often grown as an ornamental plant, it has been known to have other uses as well.

=== Food ===
It is important to take precautions when eating these plants, as milkweeds have been known to be poisonous to humans. While there have been no report of toxins in Asclepias lanceolata, many milkweeds do contain toxic resinoids, alkaloids, and cardiac glycosides. The flowers, leaves, and young seedpods of this species have been deemed safe for consumption. Seedpods should be eaten when they are between 3 and 4 cm long; their alkalinity and bitterness increases as they grow larger. Plant parts, especially stems and mature leaves, should be boiled with three changes of water to remove any possible toxins. Younger leaves, pods, and unopened flower buds can be cooked just as one would prepare spinach or broccoli. Once cooked, parts of the plant can be eaten on their own or mixed into other things such as soups. Boiling down the flower clusters containing nectar can make a sugary sweetener.

=== Medicinal ===
The only medicinal use found for A. lanceolata is the treatment of warts. Latex taken from the stems and leaves has been effective in reducing warts, but should only be used topically and should not be ingested.

=== Materials ===
The latex in the stems and leaves can be used to make rubber and in some cases, chewing gum. Gum made from this plant may possibly be toxic and is not recommended for use. Floss from the seeds can be used as a stuffing component or can be made into cloth when mixed with other materials. This floss is water resistant.
