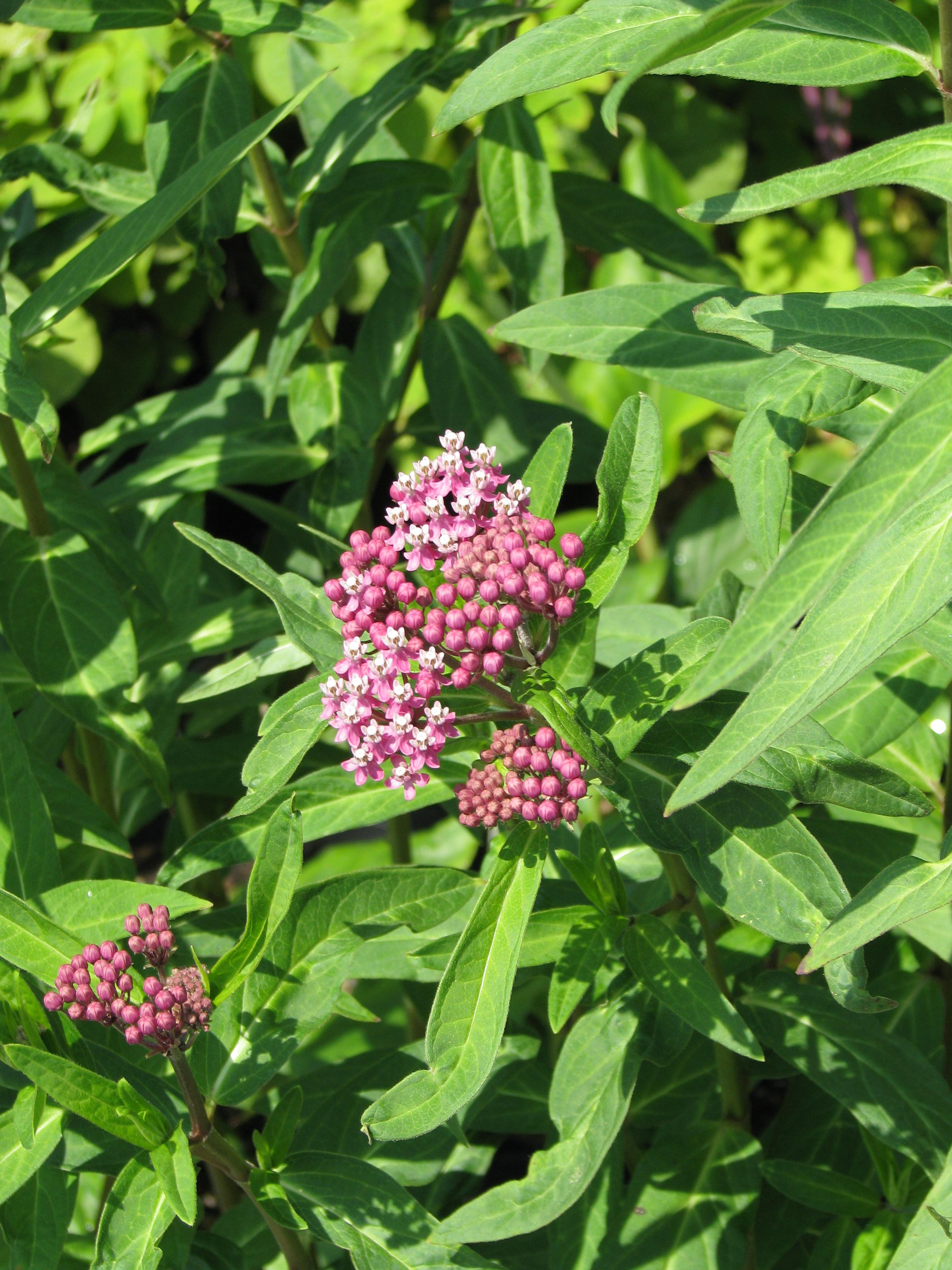

Scientific classification
- Kingdom: Plantae
- Clade: Tracheophytes
- Clade: Angiosperms
- Clade: Eudicots
- Clade: Asterids
- Order: Gentianales
- Family: Apocynaceae
- Genus: Asclepias
- Species: A. rubra

Binomial name
- Asclepias rubra L.

Synonyms
- Asclepias laurifolia Michx.

= Asclepias rubra =

Species of plant

Asclepias rubra, the red milkweed, purple savanna milkweed, or tall pink bog milkweed, is a species of milkweed. It inhabits bogs and wetlands. It is a perennial wetland species, native to New York, south to Florida, west to Arkansas and Texas.

It blooms late spring to summer. The flowers are purple, red, or pink. The plant is the larval food of the monarch butterfly. The growing conditions are moist, acidic soil, and full sunlight or partial shade and at elevations of 0-300m.
