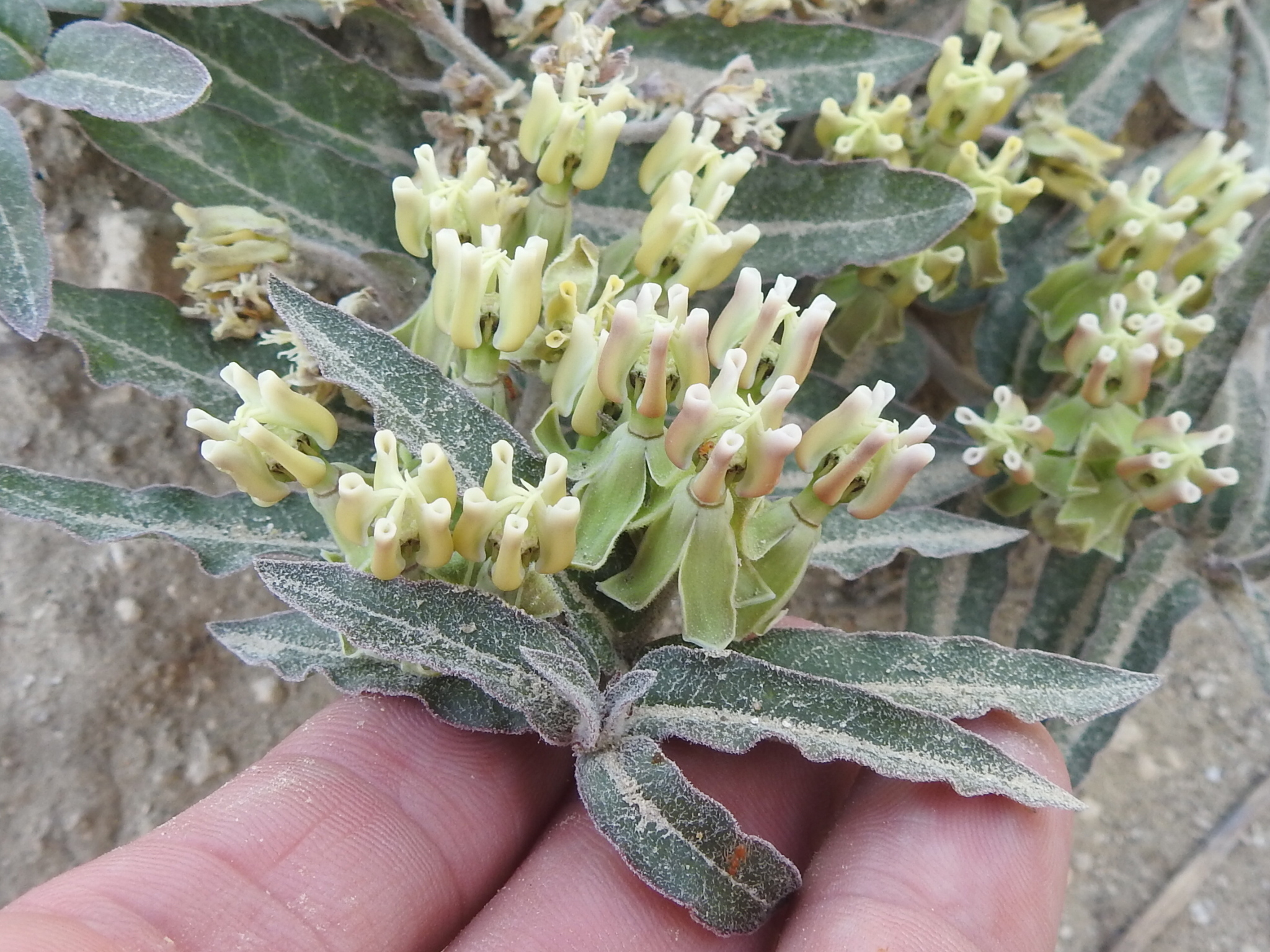

Conservation status
- Critically Imperiled (NatureServe)

Scientific classification
- Kingdom: Plantae
- Clade: Tracheophytes
- Clade: Angiosperms
- Clade: Eudicots
- Clade: Asterids
- Order: Gentianales
- Family: Apocynaceae
- Genus: Asclepias
- Species: A. prostrata

Binomial name
- Asclepias prostrata W.H.Blackw.

= Asclepias prostrata =

Species of plant

Asclepias prostrata, commonly known as prostrate milkweed, is a species of perennial plant in the genus Asclepias. It has triangular to elliptical foliage with wavy margins, stems up to 16 inches (410 mm) long, and grows low to the ground (hence the name, which refers to a prostrate growth habit) in sandy soils. Flowering may be dependent on rainfall to bring the plant out of dormancy, but is most typical from April to October. Like other milkweeds, A. prostrata flowers are a food source for pollinator insects such as bees, wasps, and the Monarch butterfly.

Native to Starr, Hidalgo, and Zapata counties of South Texas and the Mexican state of Tamaulipas, it is one of the rarest species of milkweed. In 2022, the US Fish & Wildlife Service proposed adding prostrate milkweed to the endangered species list and defining just under 700 acres of critical habitats that should be protected in order to preserve it. It is most threatened by habitat loss due to human development and invasive species such as buffelgrass.
