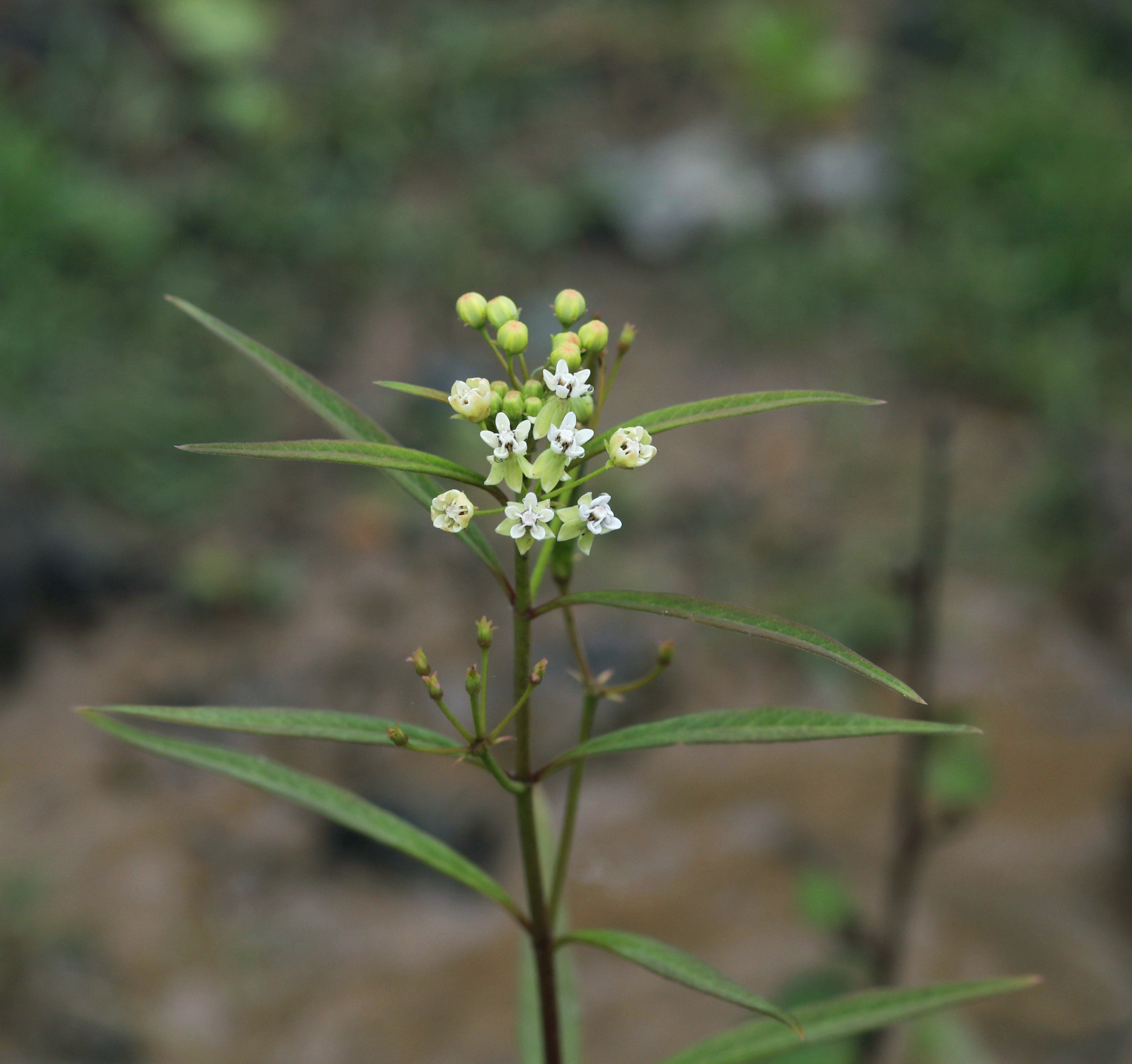

Scientific classification
- Kingdom: Plantae
- Clade: Tracheophytes
- Clade: Angiosperms
- Clade: Eudicots
- Clade: Asterids
- Order: Gentianales
- Family: Apocynaceae
- Genus: Asclepias
- Species: A. nivea

Binomial name
- Asclepias nivea L.

= Asclepias nivea =

Species of plant

Asclepias nivea, the Caribbean milkweed, is a species of milkweed. It belongs in the subfamily Asclepiadoideae. It is native to Puerto Rico and the United States Virgin Islands.
