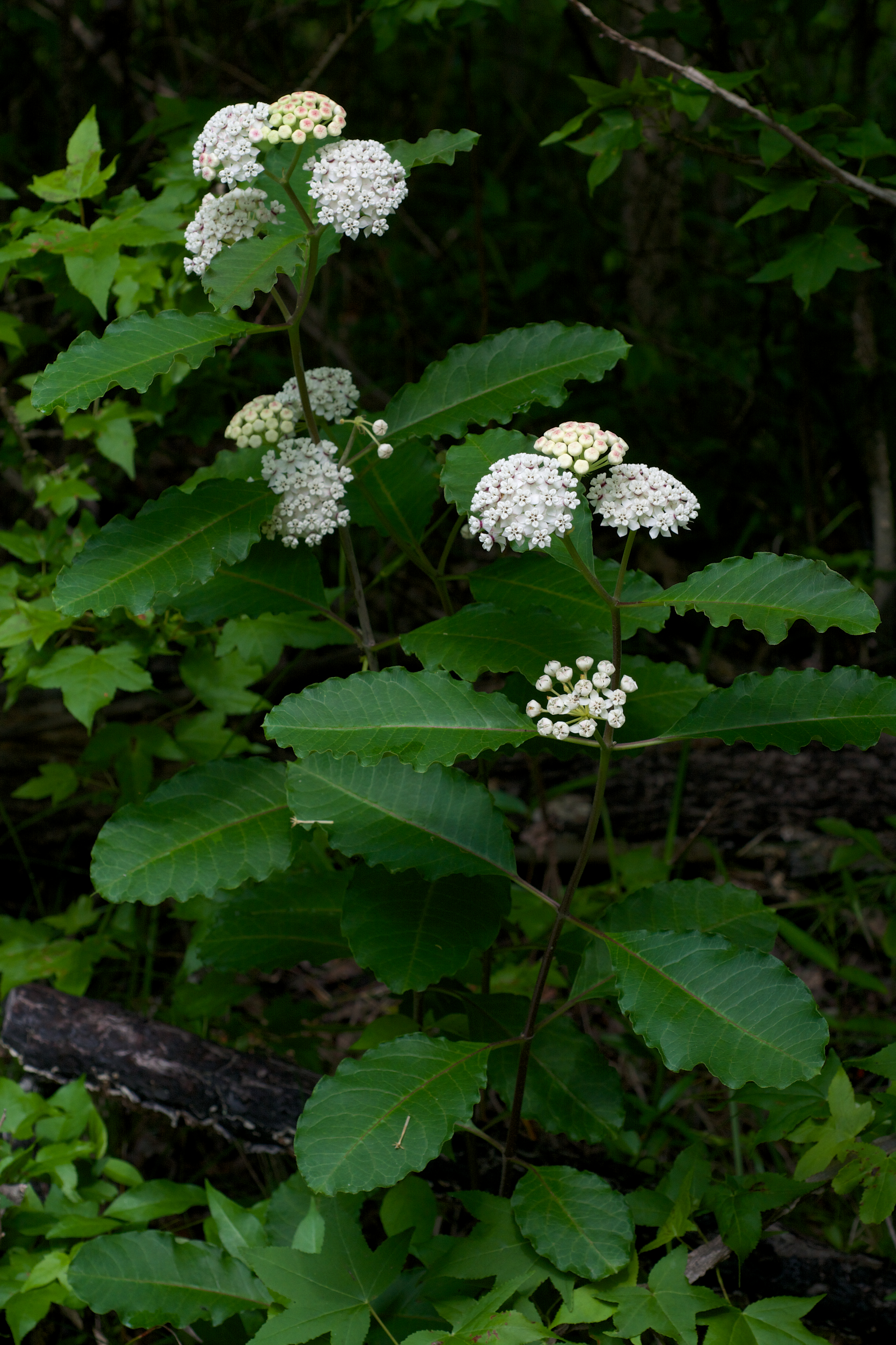

Scientific classification
- Kingdom: Plantae
- Clade: Tracheophytes
- Clade: Angiosperms
- Clade: Eudicots
- Clade: Asterids
- Order: Gentianales
- Family: Apocynaceae
- Genus: Asclepias
- Species: A. variegata

Binomial name
- Asclepias variegata L.

Synonyms
- Biventraria variegata (L.) Small

= Asclepias variegata =

Species of plant

Asclepias variegata, commonly called the redring milkweed or white milkweed, is a plant in the family Apocynaceae. It is native to eastern North America, where it is found in Canada and the United States. It is most common in the Southeastern United States, and becomes rare in the northern edge of its range.

== Description ==
Asclepias variegata is a perennial herb, with stems reaching between 20 and 100 centimeters in height. Its leaves are most commonly opposite, arranged in 2 to 5 pairs and range in length from 5 to 14 centimeters.

It produces small white flowers with purplish centers that area crowded into round, terminal clusters.

== Ecology ==
=== Habitat ===
A. variegata is found most commonly in upland woodlands and mesic hammocks, but also occurs on bluffs, and in savannas, often in sandy soils. This species prefers higher light levels.

It often occurs alongside species such as pine, hickory, oak, and sweetgum, among others.

=== Phenology ===
This species flowers in early summer. Fruiting has been observed from late summer into fall.

=== Fire Ecology ===
A. variegata possesses a deep taproot which allows it to regenerate post-fire. It has been found in pinelands and pine-oak-hickory stands that regularly receive prescribed burns.

Asclepias variegata is insect pollinated and is recorded to have been visited in northern Florida by the bee species Augochlorella aurata.

== Conservation status in the United States ==
It is endangered in the states of New York, and Pennsylvania. It is listed as a special concern species and believed extirpated in Connecticut.
