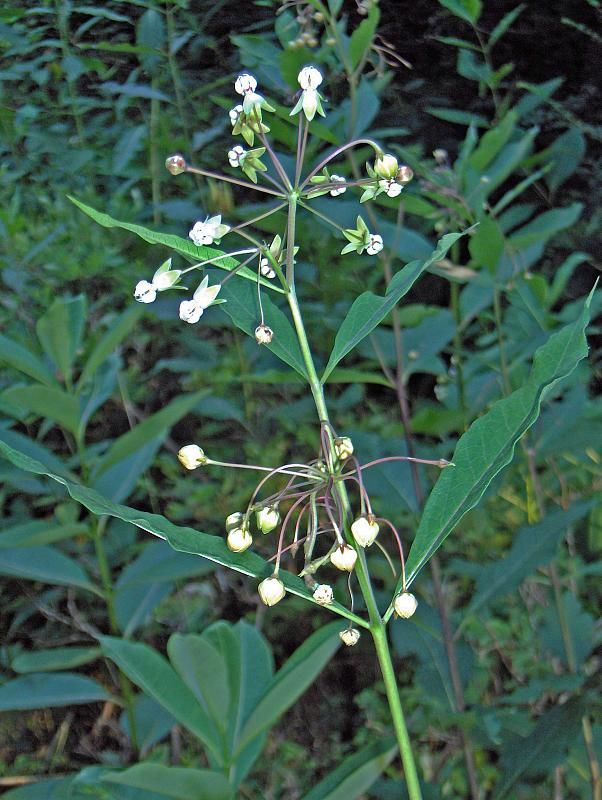

Conservation status
- Least Concern (IUCN 3.1)

Scientific classification
- Kingdom: Plantae
- Clade: Tracheophytes
- Clade: Angiosperms
- Clade: Eudicots
- Clade: Asterids
- Order: Gentianales
- Family: Apocynaceae
- Genus: Asclepias
- Species: A. exaltata

Binomial name
- Asclepias exaltata L.

= Asclepias exaltata =

Species of plant

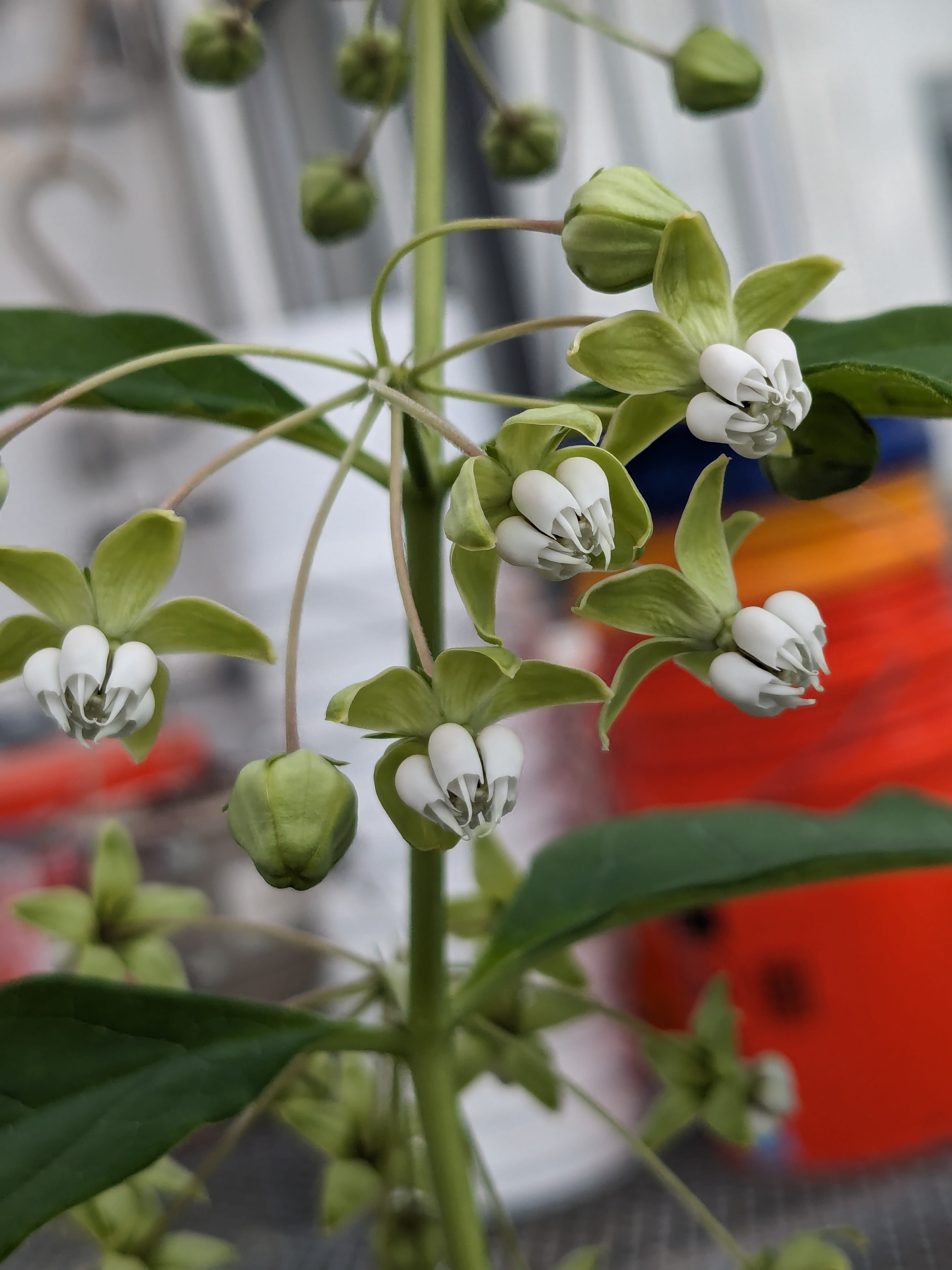
Flower head of 2-year old A. exaltata in greenhouse

Asclepias exaltata (poke milkweed or tall milkweed) is a species of flowering plant in the dogbane family, native to eastern North America.

Poke Milkweed's green and white flowers bloom from late spring to early summer. The plant's leaves can become quite large on plants growing in moist shaded conditions. The plant resembles common milkweed (A. syriaca), and can hybridize with this species where the two occur in close proximity.

Poke milkweed is found in moist woodland habitats, shores, and woodland edges. It grows in moist soil and sunny or partly shaded places. It usually grows from 2 to 6 feet (0.6 to 1.8 m) tall, but can exceed 6 feet in height under favorable conditions.
