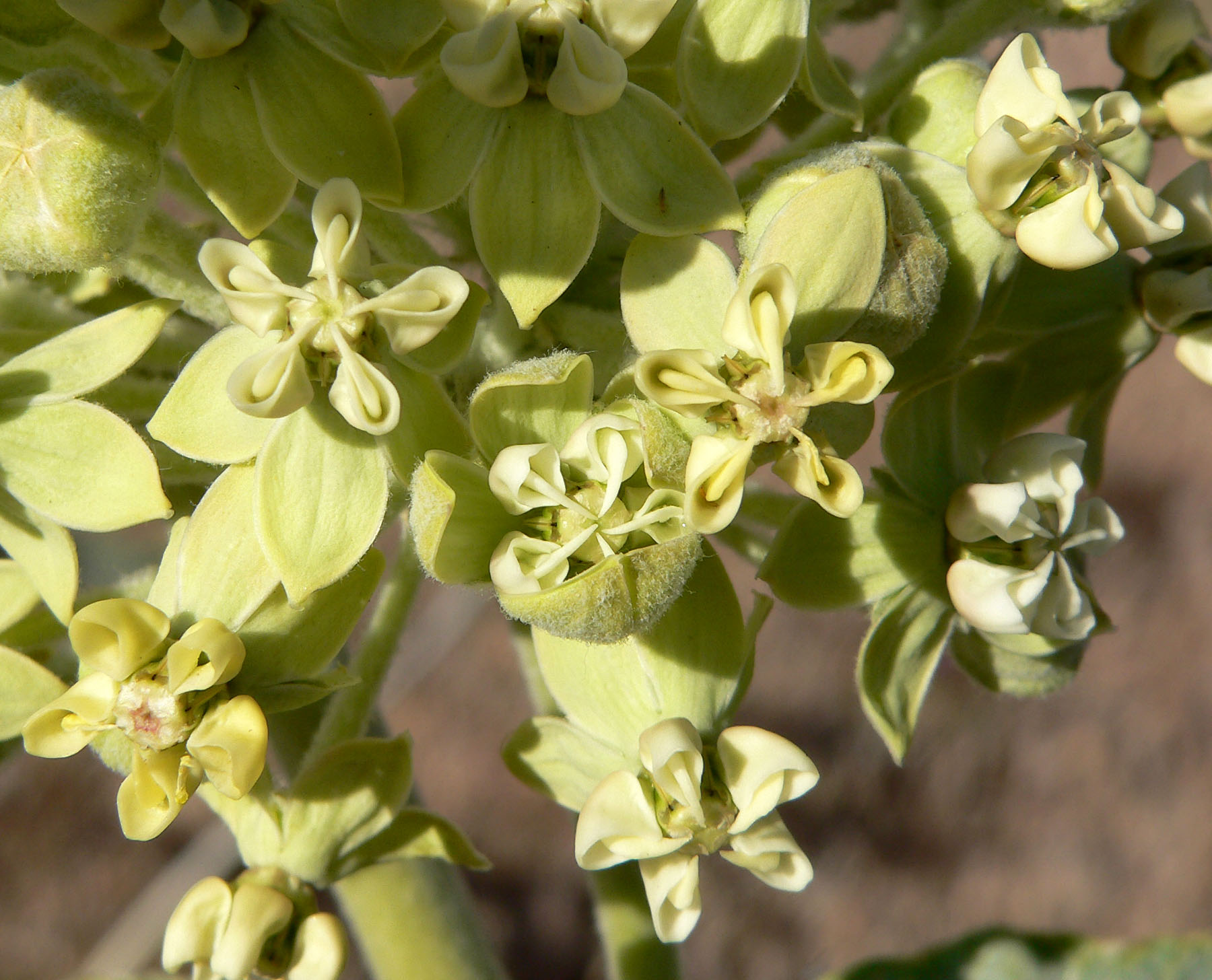

Conservation status
- Secure (NatureServe)

Scientific classification
- Kingdom: Plantae
- Clade: Tracheophytes
- Clade: Angiosperms
- Clade: Eudicots
- Clade: Asterids
- Order: Gentianales
- Family: Apocynaceae
- Genus: Asclepias
- Species: A. erosa

Binomial name
- Asclepias erosa Torr.

= Asclepias erosa =

Species of flowering plant

Asclepias erosa is a species of milkweed known commonly as desert milkweed. It is native to southern California, Arizona, and northern Baja California, where it is most abundant in the desert regions.

== Description ==
This milkweed, Asclepias erosa, is a perennial herb with erect yellow-green stems and foliage in shades of pale whitish-green to dark green with white veining. It may be hairless to very fuzzy. The sturdy, pointed leaves grow opposite on the stout stem. Atop the stem is a rounded umbel of yellowish or cream-colored flowers. Each flower has thick, reflexed corollas beneath a flower center composed of rounded, horned filaments.

== Uses ==
The plant is filled with a viscous sap that was roasted to a solid and enjoyed as a sort of chewing gum by local Native American groups. Researchers in Bard, California tested the plant as a potential source of natural rubber in 1935.

== Butterflies ==
Asclepias erosa is a specific monarch butterfly food and habitat plant.
