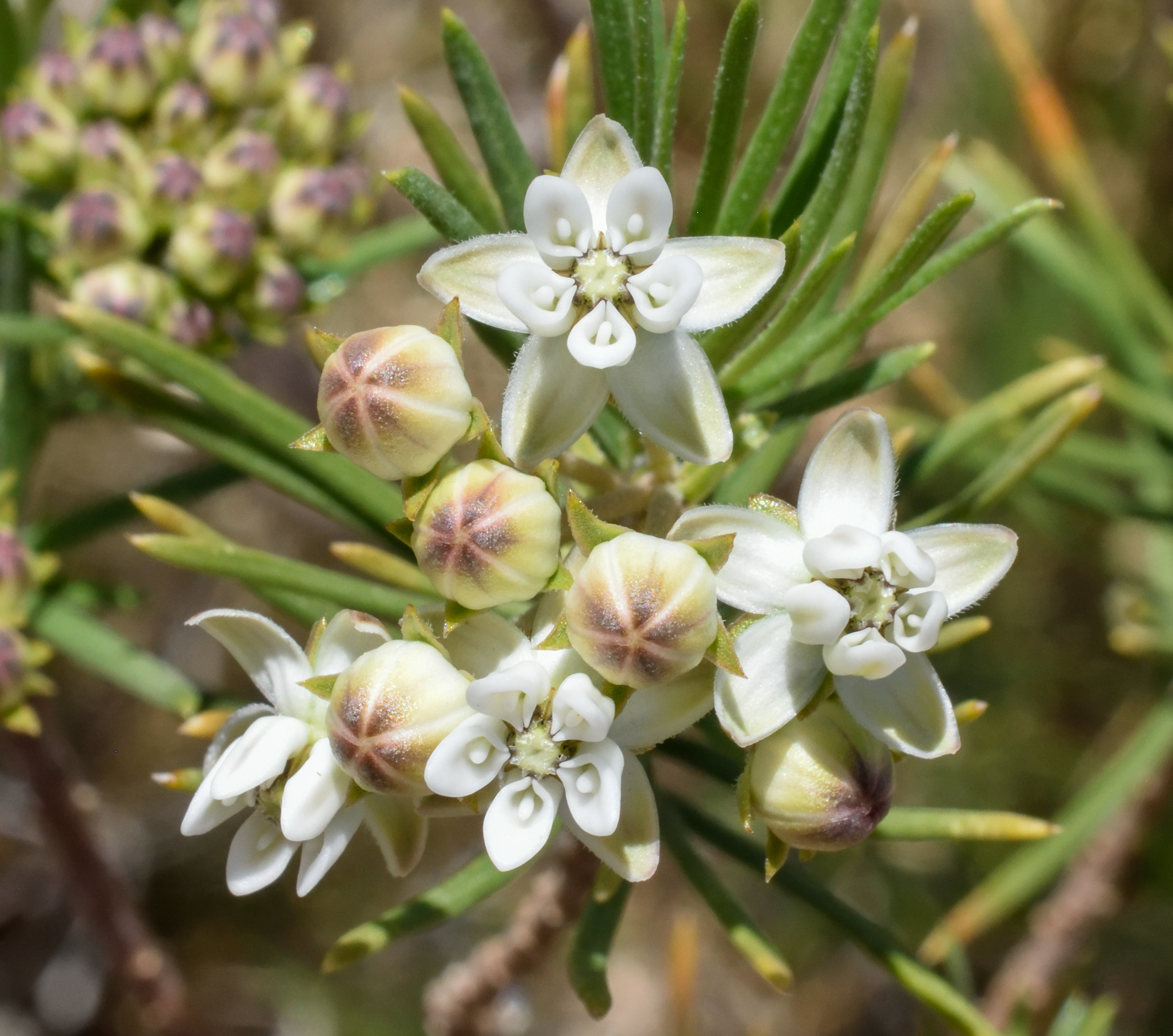

Scientific classification
- Kingdom: Plantae
- Clade: Tracheophytes
- Clade: Angiosperms
- Clade: Eudicots
- Clade: Asterids
- Order: Gentianales
- Family: Apocynaceae
- Genus: Asclepias
- Species: A. linaria

Binomial name
- Asclepias linaria Cav.

= Asclepias linaria =

Species of flowering plant

Asclepias linaria is a species of milkweed known by the common name pineneedle milkweed.

It is native to the Mojave and Sonoran Deserts of Northwestern Mexico and Arizona.

This is a large erect perennial herb or shrub coated in hairs and many narrow, green leaves which resemble pine needles. The inflorescence is an umbel-like cluster of flowers, each with pink-tinted rounded hoods at the center and greenish reflexed corollas. The fruit is a follicle.

Asclepias linaria is a larval host for the monarch butterfly.

Research indicates that the very high cardenolide content of this species reduces the impact of the OE parasite, Ophryocystis elektroscirrha, on the monarch butterfly, Danaus plexippus. By contrast, some species of Asclepias are extremely poor sources of cardenolides.
