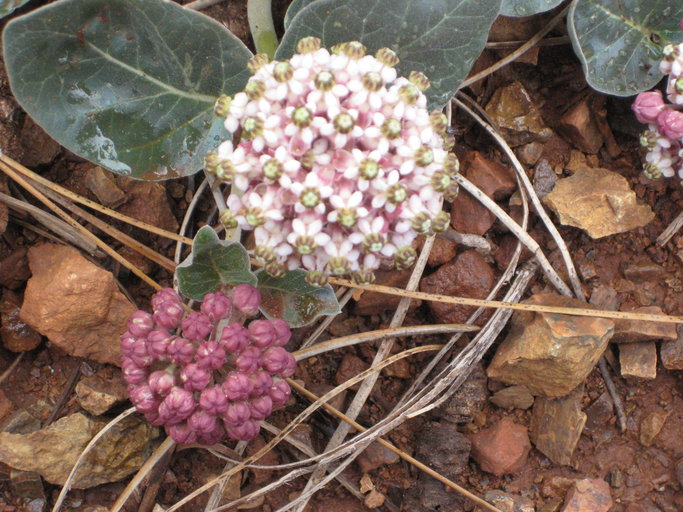

Conservation status
- Vulnerable (NatureServe)

Scientific classification
- Kingdom: Plantae
- Clade: Tracheophytes
- Clade: Angiosperms
- Clade: Eudicots
- Clade: Asterids
- Order: Gentianales
- Family: Apocynaceae
- Genus: Asclepias
- Species: A. solanoana

Binomial name
- Asclepias solanoana Woodson

Synonyms
- Gomphocarpus purpurascens A.Gray (Illegitimate, non A.Rich.); Schizonotus purpurascens (A.Gray) A.Gray; Solanoa purpurascens (A.Gray) Greene; Solanoana purpurascens (A.Gray) Greene ex Kuntze

= Asclepias solanoana =

Species of plant

Asclepias solanoana is a rare species of milkweed known by the common names serpentine milkweed, prostrate milkweed, and solanoa. It is endemic to California, where it grows only in the North Coast Ranges north of the San Francisco Bay Area.

== Description ==
This is a robust perennial herb producing smooth purple stems which lie prostrate along the ground. The thick leaves are arranged oppositely in pairs along the stem. The leaf has an oval or heart-shaped blade supported on a short petiole. The inflorescence is a heavy spherical cluster of flowers. Each flower has a central array of rounded hoods which are pink to brown and a corolla which is reflexed against the stalk or extends outwards.
