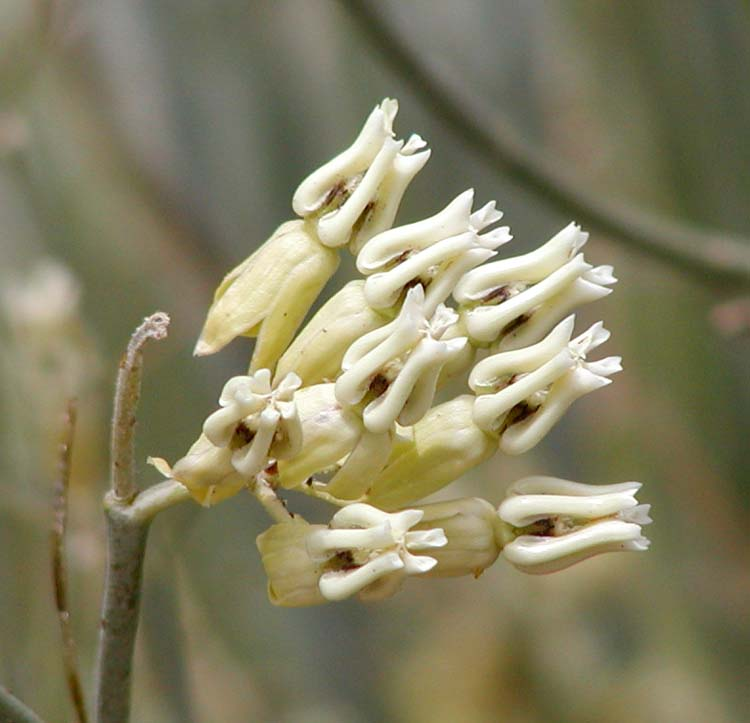

Conservation status
- Secure (NatureServe)

Scientific classification
- Kingdom: Plantae
- Clade: Tracheophytes
- Clade: Angiosperms
- Clade: Eudicots
- Clade: Asterids
- Order: Gentianales
- Family: Apocynaceae
- Genus: Asclepias
- Species: A. subulata

Binomial name
- Asclepias subulata Decne.

= Asclepias subulata =

Species of plant

Asclepias subulata is a species of milkweed known commonly as the rush milkweed, desert milkweed or ajamete. This is an erect perennial herb which loses its leaves early in the season and stands as a cluster of naked stalks. Atop the stems are inflorescences of distinctive flowers. Each cream-white flower has a reflexed corolla that reveals the inner parts, a network of five shiny columns, each topped with a tiny hook. The fruit is a pouchlike follicle that contains many flat, oval seeds with long, silky hairlike plumes. This milkweed is native to the desert southwest of the United States and northern Mexico. It grows in dry slopes, mesas, plains and desert washes.

Researchers in Bard, California, tested the plant as a potential source of natural rubber in 1935.

Asclepias subulata is a larval host for the monarch butterfly and the queen butterfly.
