= Asclepias boliviensis =

Scientific classification
- Kingdom: Plantae
- Clade: Tracheophytes
- Clade: Angiosperms
- Clade: Eudicots
- Clade: Asterids
- Order: Gentianales
- Family: Apocynaceae
- Genus: Asclepias
- Species: A. boliviensis

Binomial name
- Asclepias boliviensis E.Fourn. (1883)

Synonyms
- Asclepias weddellii; Asclepias bridgesii

Species of flowering plant

Asclepias boliviensis, is a perennial milkweed endemic to Bolivia and Argentina. It grows as a subshrub in the subtropical biome.
