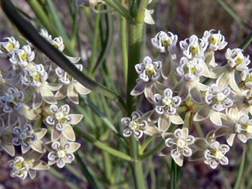

Conservation status
- Apparently Secure (NatureServe)

Scientific classification
- Kingdom: Plantae
- Clade: Tracheophytes
- Clade: Angiosperms
- Clade: Eudicots
- Clade: Asterids
- Order: Gentianales
- Family: Apocynaceae
- Genus: Asclepias
- Species: A. subverticillata

Binomial name
- Asclepias subverticillata (Gray) Vail

= Asclepias subverticillata =

Species of plant

Asclepias subverticillata is a plant found in the southwestern United States and Mexico. Common names include horsetail milkweed, poison milkweed and whorled milkweed.

== Description ==
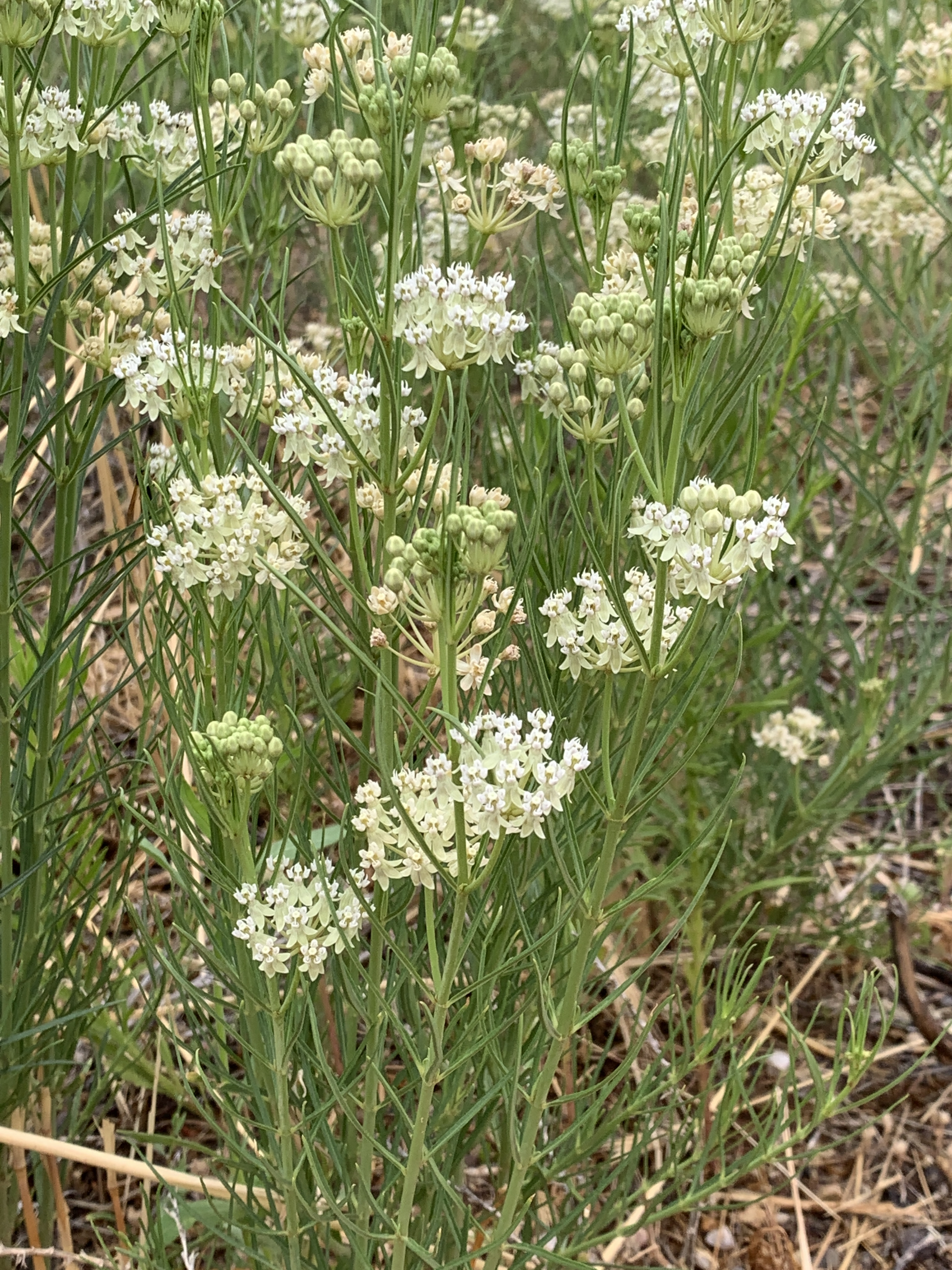
Horsetail milkweed

Growing to 1.2 metres (4 feet) in height, short branches support leaves ranging from 2–12.5 centimeters (1–5 inches) in length. Blooming from May to September, the umbel is 2–3 cm (3/4–1 1/4 in) wide, with individual flowers up to 1.5 cm (1/2 in) across; each has five petals and five sepals. The fruit pod is smooth and 5–10 cm (2–4 in) long; the seeds inside have long hairs.

== Distribution and habitat ==
It is indigenous to New Mexico, Arizona, Colorado and Utah and parts of some nearby states, in addition to Mexico.

== Toxicity ==
The species is unpalatable and very toxic to livestock.

== Uses ==
Among the Zuni people the buds are eaten by young boys. The pods are also gathered when two-thirds ripe and the fibers are used for weaving clothing. The coma is made into cords and used for fastening plumes to the prayer sticks.
