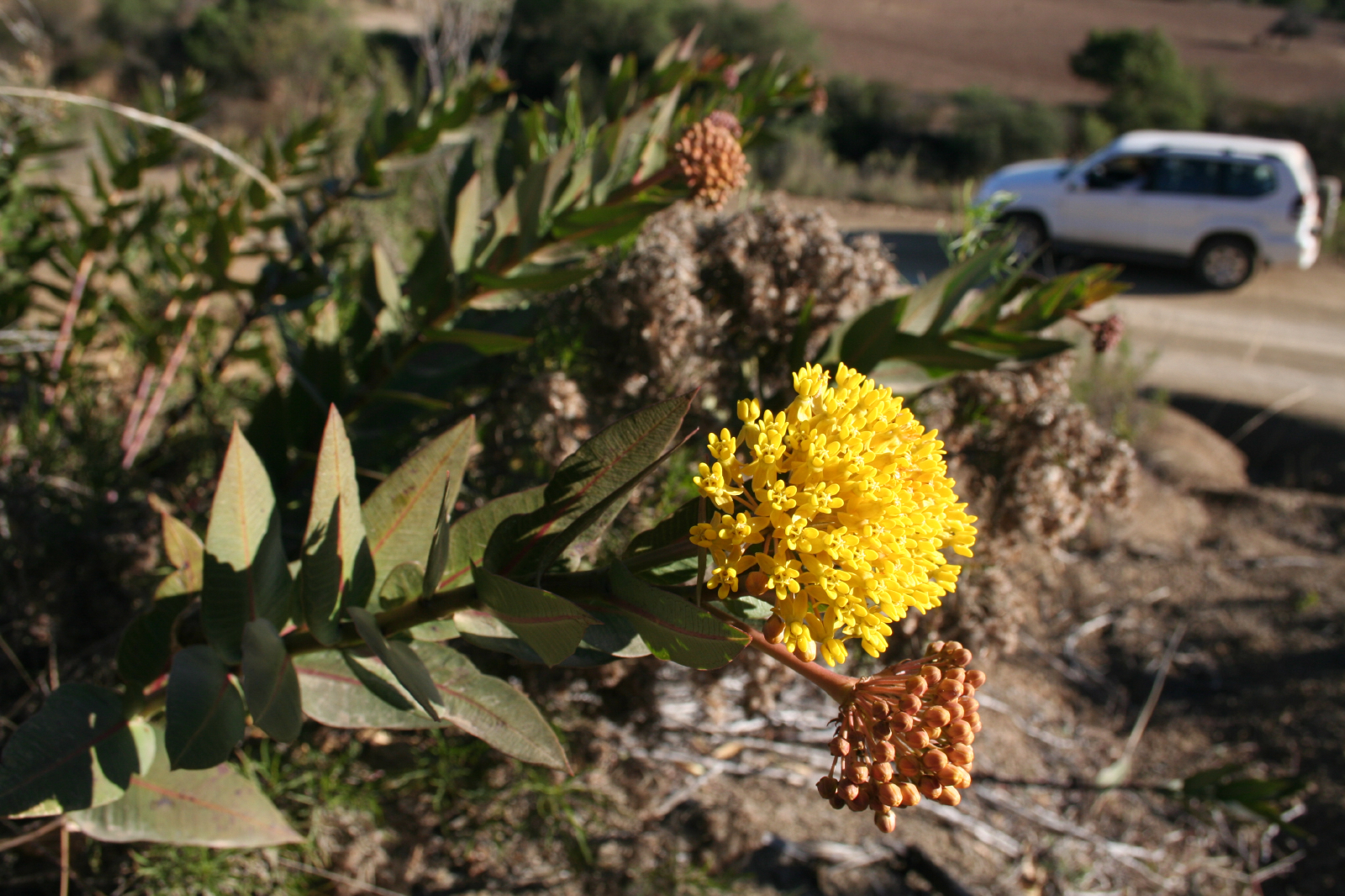

Scientific classification
- Kingdom: Plantae
- Clade: Tracheophytes
- Clade: Angiosperms
- Clade: Eudicots
- Clade: Asterids
- Order: Gentianales
- Family: Apocynaceae
- Genus: Asclepias
- Species: A. barjoniifolia

Binomial name
- Asclepias barjoniifolia E.Fourn. 1882

= Asclepias barjoniifolia =

Species of flowering plant

Asclepias barjoniifolia, the silky milkweed, is a species of perennial milkweed endemic to Bolivia and Argentina.
