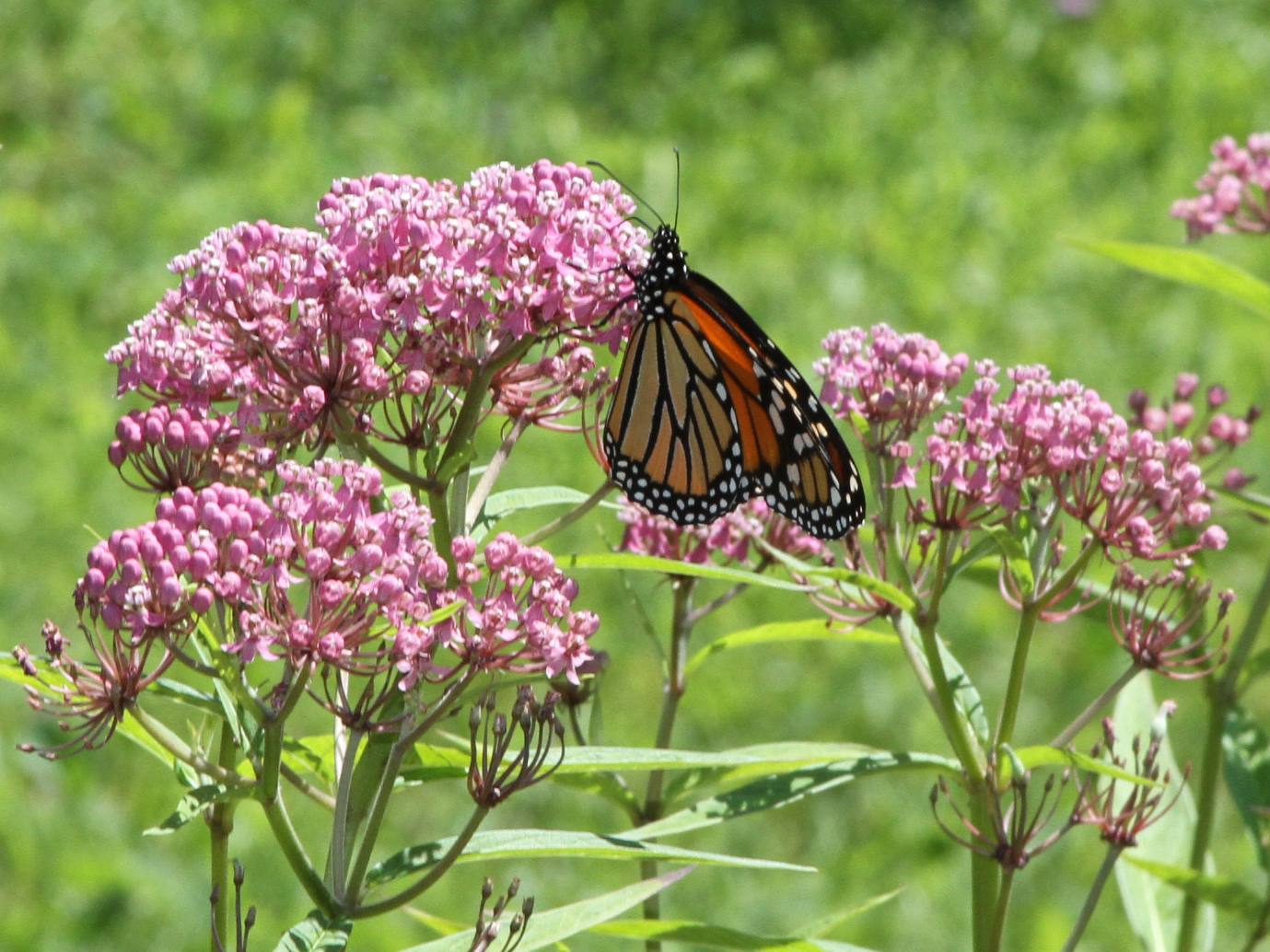
- Asclepias incarnata (swamp milkweed) flowers and a monarch butterfly

Scientific classification
- Kingdom: Plantae
- Clade: Tracheophytes
- Clade: Angiosperms
- Clade: Eudicots
- Clade: Asterids
- Order: Gentianales
- Family: Apocynaceae
- Subfamily: Asclepiadoideae
- Tribe: Asclepiadeae
- Subtribe: Asclepiadinae
- Genus: Asclepias; L.

Type species
- Asclepias syriaca L.

Species
- See List of Asclepias species

Synonyms
- List: Acerates Elliott; Acerotis Raf.; Acerates Stopp; Anantherix Nutt.; Anthanotis Raf.; Asclepiodella Small; Asclepiodora A.Gray; Biventraria Small; Crassa Ruppius; Dassovia Neck.; Odontostelma Rendle; Oligoron Raf.; Onistis Raf.; Otanema Raf.; Otaria Kunth; Oxypteryx Greene; Podostemma Greene; Podostigma Elliott; Polyotus Nutt.; Schizonotus A.Gray; Solanoa Greene; Solanoana Kuntze; Stylandra Nutt.; Trachycalymma (K.Schum.) Bullock

= Asclepias =

Genus of flowering plants

Asclepias is a genus of herbaceous, perennial, flowering plants known as milkweeds, named for their latex, a milky substance containing cardiac glycosides termed cardenolides, exuded where cells are damaged. Most species are toxic to humans and many other species, primarily due to the presence of cardenolides. However, as with many such plants, some species feed upon milkweed leaves or the nectar from their flowers. A noteworthy feeder on milkweeds is the monarch butterfly, which uses and requires certain milkweeds as host plants for its larvae.

The Asclepias genus contains over 200 species distributed broadly across Africa, North America, and South America. It previously belonged to the family Asclepiadaceae, which is now classified as the subfamily Asclepiadoideae of the dogbane family, Apocynaceae.

== Etymology ==
In the first century AD, Dioscorides described a plant called ἀσκληπιάς (asklēpiás) in Greek and Pliny the Elder described a plant called asclepias in Latin. Though usually explained as being derived from the name of the Greek medical god Asklepios, neither author mentioned the god in connection with this plant. Their plant has since been commonly identified as the plant now known as Vincetoxicum hirundinaria. Some botanists have disagreed as, though the old descriptions are short and vague, Vincetoxicum hirundinaria does not have leaves like ivy.

Linnaeus first described the genus Asclepias in his Genera Plantarum of 1737 without specifying any particular plants in the genus. Linnaeus published his Flora Suecica in 1745 and Materia Medica in 1749. The only Asclepias he mentioned in either book was the one he would later name as Asclepias vincetoxicum. Both books mentioned that in pharmacy this plant was called Hirundinariæ. In none of his works does Linnaeus give an origin for the name Asclepias, presumably because it was being used for these plants by some herbalists and botanists for centuries before. These publications were before his 1753 innovation of names that were simply two words - genus and species - rather than a much longer description.

When Linnaeus described the 18 species that he assigned to the genus Asclepias in his Species Plantarum of 1753, he included Asclepias vincetoxicum. That plant is now called Vincetoxicum hirundinaria. Of those 18, 7 have been assigned to other genera in the years since: Xysmalobium undulatum, Calotropis gigantea, Gymnema lactiferum, Vincetoxicum hirundinaria, Vincetoxicum nigrum, Gomphocarpus fruticosus and Cynanchum thesioides. The species that remain in Asclepias from those Linnaeus described are: A. syriaca, A. amoena and A. purpurascens both now regarded as A. purpurascens, A. variegata, A. nivea, A. incarnata, A. curassavica, A. decumbens and A. tuberosa both now regarded as A. tuberosa, A. verticillata and A. rubra.

== Flowers ==
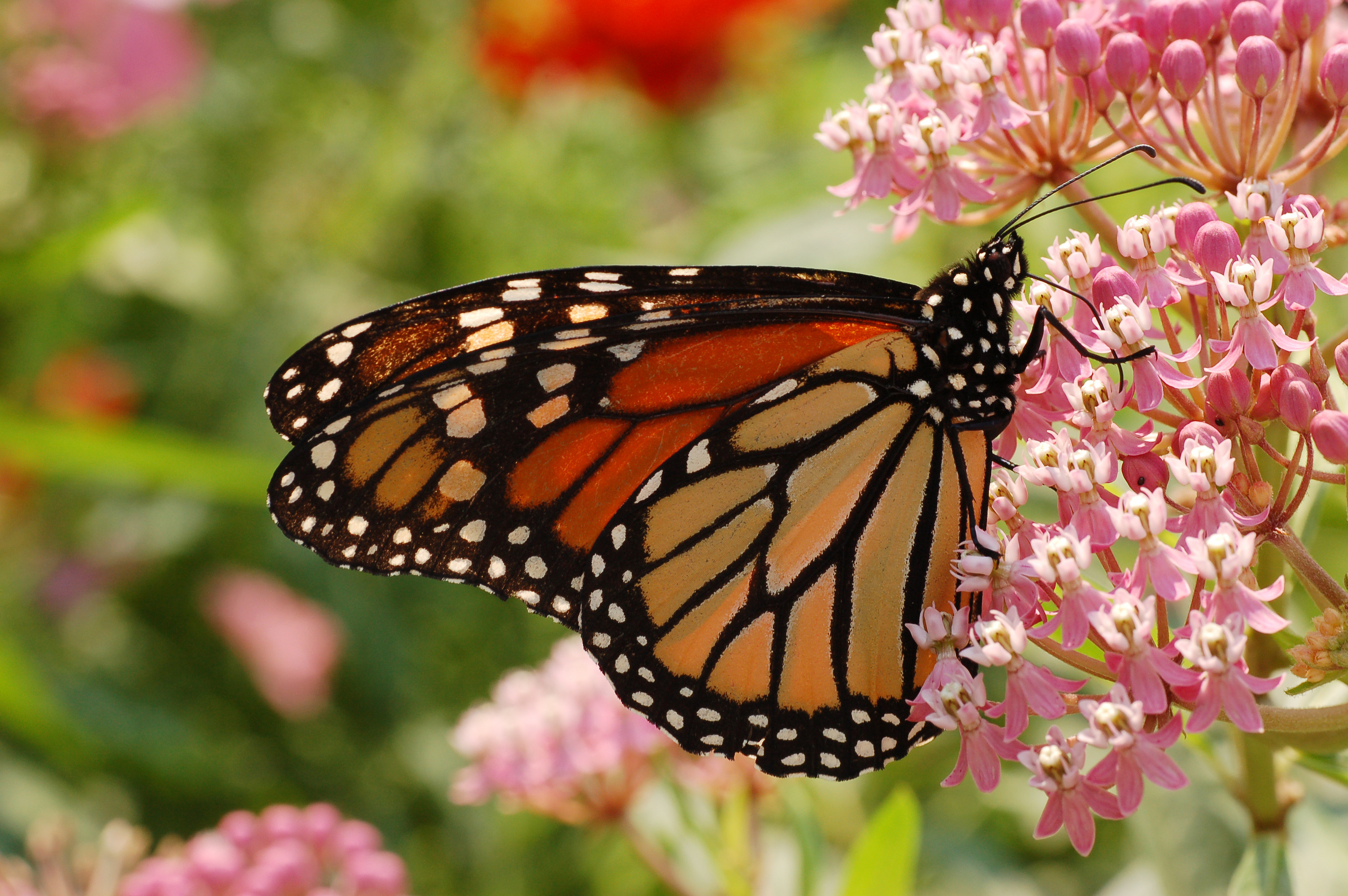
A monarch butterfly on swamp milkweed

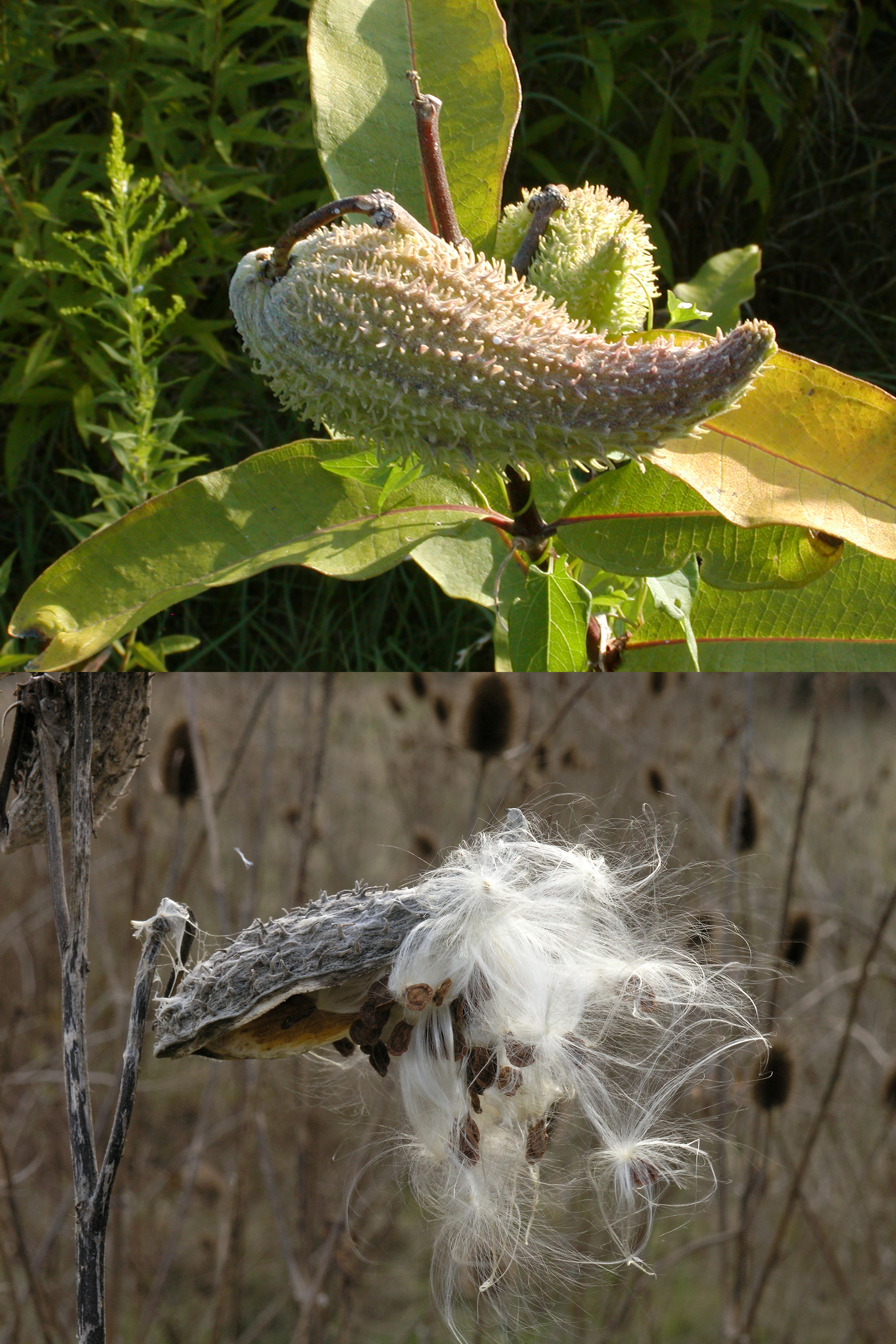
Asclepias syriaca seed pods, upper image from August and lower from December

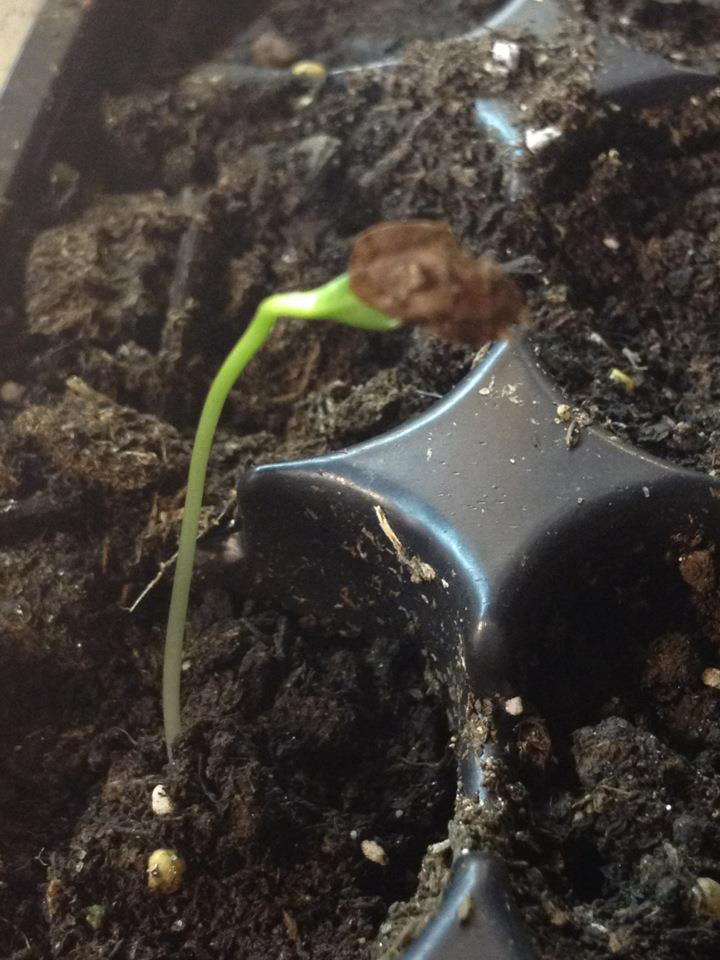
Milkweed sprout, a few days after sowing

Chemical structure of oleandrin, one of the cardiac glycosides

Members of the genus produce some of the most complex flowers in the plant kingdom, comparable to orchids in complexity. Five petals reflex backwards revealing a gynostegium surrounded by a five-membrane corona. The corona is composed of a five-paired hood-and-horn structure with the hood acting as a sheath for the inner horn. Glands holding pollinia are found between the hoods. The size, shape and color of the horns and hoods are often important identifying characteristics for species in the genus Asclepias.

Pollination in this genus is accomplished in an unusual manner. Pollen is grouped into complex structures called pollinia (or "pollen sacs"), rather than being individual grains or tetrads, as is typical for most plants. The feet or mouthparts of flower-visiting insects, such as bees, wasps, and butterflies, slip into one of the five slits in each flower formed by adjacent anthers. The bases of the pollinia then mechanically attach to the insect, so that a pair of pollen sacs can be pulled free when the pollinator flies off, assuming the insect is large enough to produce the necessary pulling force (if not, the insect may become trapped and die). Pollination is effected by the reverse procedure, in which one of the pollinia becomes trapped within the anther slit. Large-bodied hymenopterans (bees, wasps) are the most common and best pollinators, accounting for over 50% of all Asclepias pollination, whereas monarch butterflies are poor pollinators of milkweed.

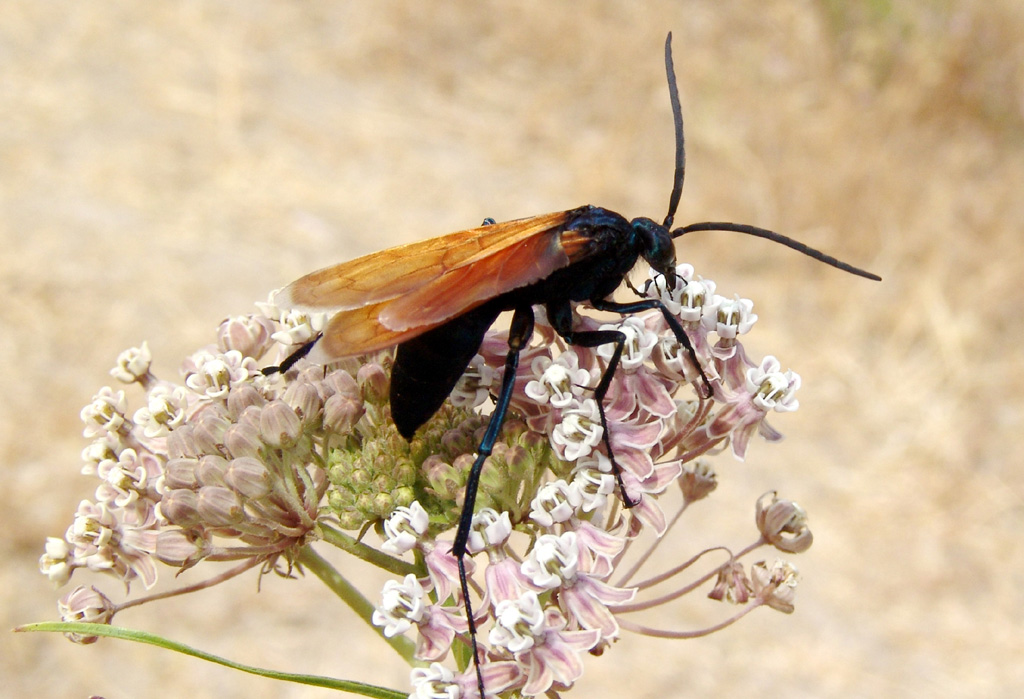
Male Pepsis grossa, a typical milkweed-pollinating wasp

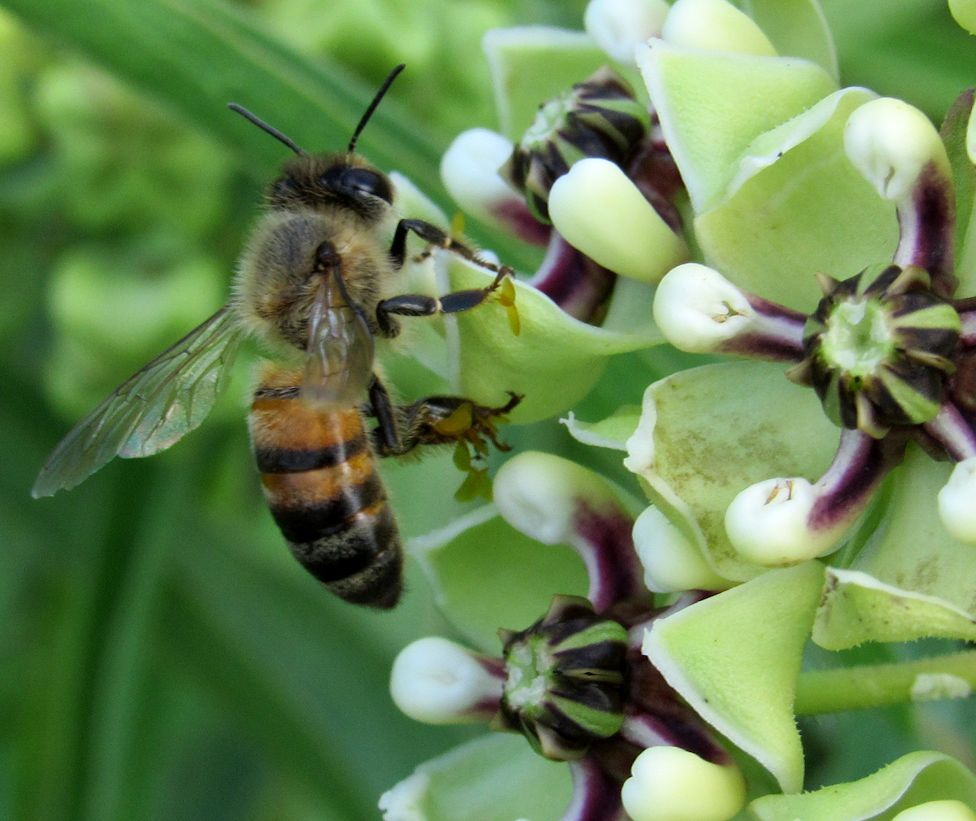
Honeybee on antelope horn (Asclepias asperula) showing pollinia attached to legs

Milkweed seeds dispersed by the wind.

Asclepias species produce their seeds in pods termed follicles. The seeds, which are arranged in overlapping rows, bear a cluster of white, silky, filament-like hairs known as the coma (often referred to by other names such as pappus, "floss", "plume", or "silk"). The follicles ripen and split open, and the seeds, each carried by its coma, are blown by the wind. Some, but not all, milkweeds also reproduce by clonal (or vegetative) reproduction.

== Selected species ==
Image	Scientific name	Common name	Native distribution
	Asclepias albicans	Whitestem milkweed	Native to the Mojave and Sonoran deserts
	Asclepias amplexicaulis	Blunt-leaved milkweed	Native to central and eastern United States
	Asclepias asperula	Antelope horns	Native to American southwest and northern Mexico
	Asclepias californica	California milkweed	Native to central and southern California
	Asclepias cordifolia	Heart-leaf milkweed	Native to the Sierra Nevada and Cascade Range up to 2,000 m (6,600 ft)
	Asclepias cryptoceras	Pallid milkweed	Native to the western United States.
	Asclepias curassavica	Scarlet milkweed, tropical milkweed, bloodflower, bastard ipecacuanha	Native to the American tropics, introduced to other continents
	Asclepias curtissii	Curtiss's milkweed	Endemic to sandy areas of Florida
	Asclepias eriocarpa	Woollypod milkweed	Native to California, Baja California, and Nevada
	Asclepias erosa	Desert milkweed	Native to California, Arizona, and Baja California
	Asclepias exaltata	Poke milkweed	Native from Quebec to Ontario and from Maine to Minnesota, south to Georgia and Mississippi
	Asclepias fascicularis	Narrow-leaf milkweed	Native from northeastern Washington and Idaho, south to Baja California and northern Arizona
	Asclepias hirtella	Tall green milkweed	Native to Canada and the Midwestern and Upper South United States
	Asclepias humistrata	Sandhill milkweed	Native to southeastern United States
	Asclepias incarnata	Swamp milkweed	Native from Manitoba to Quebec and Nova Scotia, from New England south to Georgia, west to Louisiana and Texas, and north to North Dakota
	Asclepias lanceolata	Lanceolate milkweed (Cedar Hill milkweed)	Native to coastal plain of eastern United States from Texas to New Jersey
	Asclepias linaria	Pine needle milkweed	Native to Mojave and Sonoran deserts
	Asclepias meadii	Mead's milkweed	Native to midwestern United States
	Asclepias nyctaginifolia	Mojave milkweed	native to the American southwest
	Asclepias purpurascens	Purple milkweed	Native to eastern, southern, and midwestern United States
	Asclepias prostrata	Prostrate milkweed	Native to Texas and northern Mexico
	Asclepias quadrifolia	Four-leaved milkweed	Native to eastern United States and Canada
	Asclepias rubra	Red milkweed	Native to New York, south to Florida, and west to Arizona and Texas
	Asclepias solanoana	Serpentine milkweed	Native to northern California
	Asclepias speciosa	Showy milkweed	Native to western United States and Canada
	Asclepias subulata	Rush milkweed	Native to southwestern North America
	Asclepias subverticillata	Horsetail milkweed	Native to southwestern United States and Mexico
	Asclepias sullivantii	Sullivant's milkweed	Native to the midwestern United States and Canada, ranging north to Minnesota, east to southern Ontario and Ohio, west to Nebraska, Kansas, and south to Oklahoma. It is considered rare in Minnesota, Wisconsin, and Ontario, and is known only from historical records in North Dakota.
	Asclepias syriaca	Common milkweed	Native to southern Canada and much of the United States east of the Rocky Mountains, excluding Florida and the drier parts of the prairies
	Asclepias texana	Texas milkweed	Native from central Texas west to the Edwards Plateau and south into Coahuila and the Chihuahuan Desert as far south as Durango
	Asclepias tuberosa	Butterfly weed, pleurisy root	Native from Ontario to Newfoundland and New England, south to Florida, west to Texas, and north through Colorado to Minnesota
	Asclepias uncialis	Wheel milkweed	Native to Arizona, Colorado, New Mexico, Nevada, Oklahoma, Texas, Utah and Wyoming
	Asclepias variegata	White milkweed	Native to New York and Connecticut, south to Florida, west to Texas and Oklahoma, and northeast to Illinois and Ohio
	Asclepias verticillata	Whorled milkweed	Native from Massachusetts to Montana, south to Florida and eastern Texas; also southern Canada
	Asclepias viridiflora	Green milkweed	Native from Ontario to British Columbia and from Massachusetts and New York to Montana, south to Florida, Texas, and Arizona
	Asclepias viridis	Green antelopehorn, spider milkweed	Native from West Virginia to Nebraska, south to Florida and Texas
	Asclepias welshii	Welsh's milkweed	Native to southern Utah and northern Arizona

There are also 12 species of Asclepias in South America, among them: A. barjoniifolia, A. boliviensis, A. curassavica, A. mellodora, A. candida, A. flava, and A. pilgeriana.

== Ecology ==
Milkweeds are an important nectar source for native bees, wasps, and other nectar-seeking insects, though non-native honey bees commonly get trapped in the stigmatic slits and die. Milkweeds are also the larval food source for monarch butterflies and their relatives, as well as a variety of other herbivorous insects (including numerous beetles, moths, and true bugs) specialized to feed on the plants despite their chemical defenses.

Milkweeds use three primary defenses to limit damage caused by caterpillars: hairs on the leaves (trichomes), cardenolide toxins, and latex fluids. Data from a DNA study indicate that, generally, more recently evolved milkweed species ("derived" in botany parlance) use these preventive strategies less but grow faster than older species, potentially regrowing faster than caterpillars can consume them.

Research indicates that the very high cardenolide content of Asclepias linaria reduces the impact of the Ophryocystis elektroscirrha (OE) parasite on the monarch butterfly, Danaus plexippus. The OE parasite causes holes to form in the wings of fully developed monarch butterflies. This causes weakened endurance and an inability to migrate. The parasite only infects monarchs when they are larvae and caterpillars, but the detriment is when they are in their butterfly form. By contrast, some species of Asclepias are extremely poor sources of cardenolides, such as Asclepias fascicularis, Asclepias tuberosa, and Asclepias angustifolia.

=== Monarch butterfly conservation and milkweeds ===
The leaves of Asclepias species are a food source for monarch butterfly larvae and some other milkweed butterflies. These plants are often used in butterfly gardening and monarch waystations in an effort to help increase the dwindling monarch population.

However, some milkweed species are not suitable for butterfly gardens and monarch waystations. For example, A. curassavica, or tropical milkweed, is often planted as an ornamental in butterfly gardens outside of its native range of Mexico and Central America. Year-round plantings of this species in the United States are controversial and criticised, as they may lead to new overwintering sites along the US Gulf Coast and the consequent year-round breeding of monarchs. This is thought to adversely affect migration patterns, and to cause a dramatic build-up of the parasite Ophryocystis elektroscirrha. New research also has shown that monarch larvae reared on tropical milkweed show reduced migratory development (reproductive diapause), and when migratory adults are exposed to tropical milkweed, it stimulates reproductive tissue growth.

Because of this, it is most often suggested to grow milkweeds that are native to the geographical area they are planted in to prevent negative impacts on monarch butterflies.

Monarch caterpillars do not favor butterfly weed (A. tuberosa), perhaps because the leaves of that milkweed species contain very little cardenolide.

== Uses ==
Milkweeds have only started recently to be grown commercially in large scale, but the plants have had many uses throughout human history. Milkweeds have a long history of medicinal, every day, and military use. The Omaha people from Nebraska, the Menominee from Wisconsin and upper Michigan, the Dakota from Minnesota, and the Ponca people from Nebraska, traditionally used common milkweed (A. syriaca) for medicinal purposes. The bast fibers of some species can be used for rope. The Miwok people of northern California used heart-leaf milkweed (A. cordifolia) for its stems, which they dried and used for cords, strings and ropes.

The fine, silky fluff attached to milkweed seeds, which allows them to be distributed long distances on the wind, is known as floss. Milkweed floss is incredibly difficult to spin due to how short and smooth the filaments are, but blending it with as little as 25% wool or other fiber can produce workable yarn.

A study of the insulative properties of various materials found that milkweed floss was outperformed by other materials in terms of insulation, loft, and lumpiness, but it scored well when mixed with down feathers. The milkweed filaments from the coma (the "floss") are hollow and coated with wax, and have good insulation qualities. During World War II, more than 5,000 t (5,500 short tons) of milkweed floss was collected in the US as a substitute for kapok in life jackets. Milkweed is grown commercially as a hypoallergenic filling for pillows and as insulation for winter coats. Using milkweed floss for these purposes could provide a plant-based alternative to down and promote the growth of milkweed in areas where it has declined, though there is some concern that the environmental impacts could be negative if monoculture is used.

A. syriaca grown in the St Lawrence Valley of Quebec is known as soie d'Amérique "Silk of America" using a term "silk" applied by the naturalist Charles Sigisbert Sonnini in 1810, when the plant was used in France to produce a fiber for fabric. Milkweed floss can be used in thermal insulation and acoustic insulation. It is highly buoyant and water-repellent, but absorbs oil readily, so it can be used for oil spill cleanup.

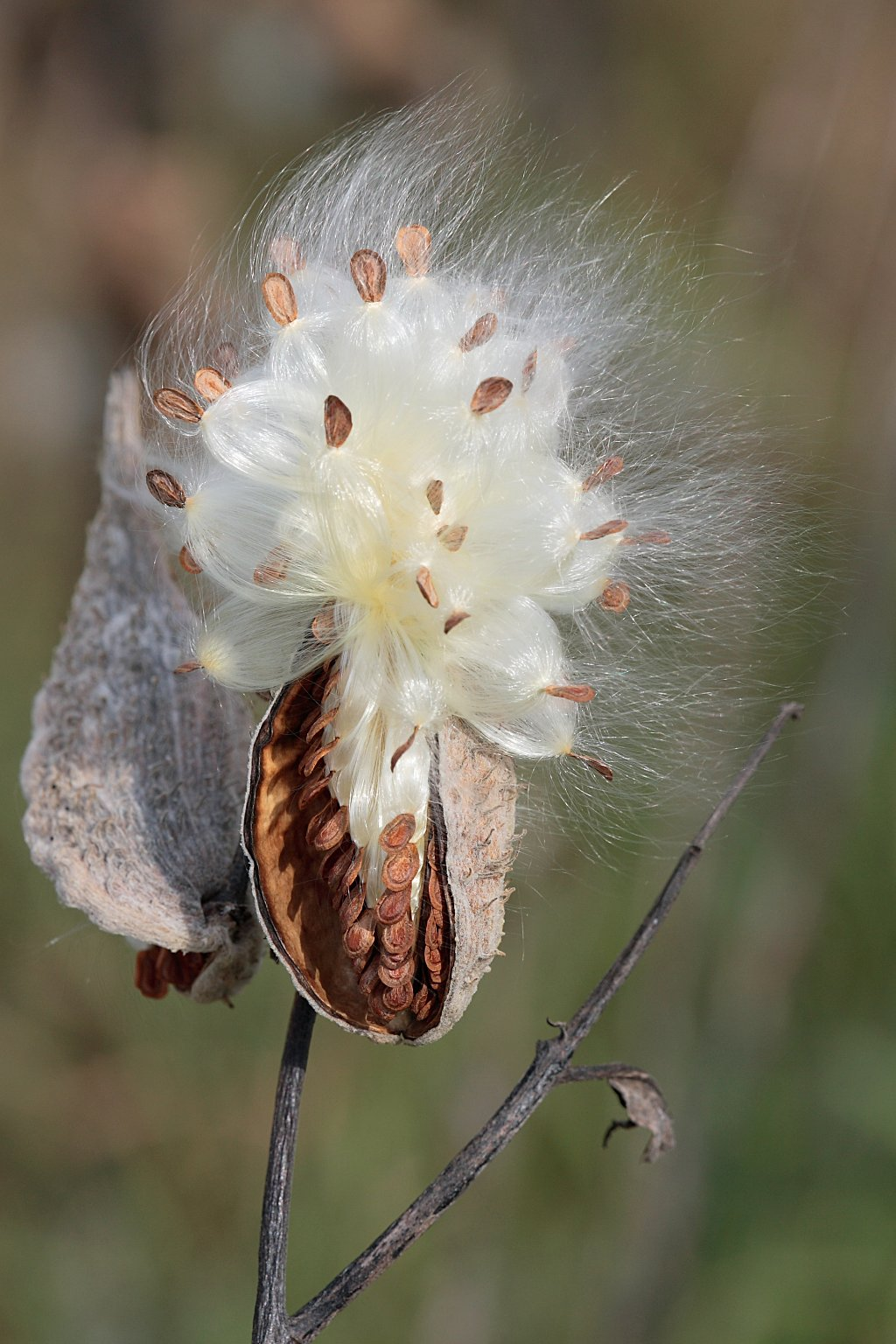
Seeds of Asclepias syriaca (common milkweed)

Milkweed sap contains about two percent latex, and during World War II both Nazi Germany and the US attempted to use it as a source of natural rubber, although no record of large-scale success has been found.

Many milkweed species also contain cardiac glycoside poisons that inhibit animal cells from maintaining a proper K^{+}, Ca^{2+} concentration gradient. As a result, many peoples of South America and Africa used arrows poisoned with these glycosides to fight and hunt more effectively. Some milkweeds are toxic enough to cause death when animals consume large quantities of the plant. Some milkweeds also cause mild dermatitis in some who come in contact with them. Nonetheless, some species can be made edible if properly processed.

== Other source ==
- Everitt, J. H.; Lonard, R. L.; Little, C. R. (2007). Weeds in South Texas and Northern Mexico. Lubbock: Texas Tech University Press. ISBN 978-0-89672-614-7.
