= List of Asclepias species =

Flowering plant species list

This is a list of species in the flowering plant genus Asclepias (milkweeds). As of February 2024, Plants of the World Online accepts 204 species in Asclepias.
A B C D E F G H I J K L M N O P Q R S T U V W X Y Z

== A ==
- Asclepias adscendens (Schltr.) Schltr.
- Asclepias albens (E.Mey.) Schltr.
- Asclepias albicans S.Watson
- Asclepias alpestris (K.Schum.) Goyder
- Asclepias amabilis N.E.Br.
- Asclepias ameliae S.Moore
- Asclepias amplexicaulis Sm.
- Asclepias angustifolia Schweigg.
- Asclepias apocynifolia Woodson
- Asclepias arenaria Torr.
- Asclepias asperula (Decne.) Woodson
- Asclepias atroviolacea Woodson
- Asclepias aurea (Schltr.) Schltr.
- Asclepias auriculata Kunth

== B ==
- Asclepias barjoniifolia E.Fourn.
- Asclepias bartlettiana Woodson
- Asclepias baumii Schltr.
- Asclepias bicuspis N.E.Br.
- Asclepias bifida W.H.Blackw.
- Asclepias boliviensis E.Fourn.
- Asclepias brachystephana Engelm. ex Torr.
- Asclepias bracteolata E.Fourn.
- Asclepias breviantherae Goyder
- Asclepias brevicuspis (E.Mey.) Schltr.
- Asclepias brevipes (Schltr.) Schltr.
- Asclepias buchwaldii (Schltr. & K.Schum.) De Wild.

== C ==
- Asclepias californica Greene
- Asclepias candida Vell.
- Asclepias cinerea Walter
- Asclepias circinalis (Decne.) Woodson
- Asclepias compressidens (N.E.Br.) Nicholas
- Asclepias concinna (Schltr.) Schltr.
- Asclepias connivens Baldwin ex Elliott
- Asclepias constricta M.E.Jones
- Asclepias conzattii Woodson
- Asclepias cooperi N.E.Br.
- Asclepias cordifolia (Benth.) Jeps.
- Asclepias coulteri A.Gray
- Asclepias crassicoronata Goyder
- Asclepias crassinervis N.E.Br.
- Asclepias crispa P.J.Bergius
- Asclepias crocea Woodson
- Asclepias cryptoceras S.Watson
- Asclepias cucullata (Schltr.) Schltr.
- Asclepias cultriformis Harv. ex Schltr.
- Asclepias curassavica L.
- Asclepias curtissii A.Gray
- Asclepias cutleri Woodson

== D-F ==
- Asclepias densiflora N.E.Br.
- Asclepias dependens (K.Schum.) N.E.Br.
- Asclepias depressa (Schltr.) Schltr.
- Asclepias disparilis N.E.Br.
- Asclepias dissona N.E.Br.
- Asclepias eastwoodiana Barneby
- Asclepias edentata Goyder
- Asclepias elata Benth.
- Asclepias elegantula Fishbein
- Asclepias eminens (Harv.) Schltr.
- Asclepias emoryi (Greene) Vail
- Asclepias engelmanniana Woodson
- Asclepias eriocarpa Benth.
- Asclepias erosa Torr.
- Asclepias euphorbiifolia Engelm. ex A.Gray
- Asclepias exaltata L.
- Asclepias expansa (E.Mey.) Schltr.
- Asclepias fallax (Schltr.) Schltr.
- Asclepias fascicularis Decne.
- Asclepias feayi Chapm. ex A.Gray
- Asclepias fimbriata Weim.
- Asclepias flanaganii Schltr.
- Asclepias flexuosa (E.Mey. ex Decne.) Schltr.
- Asclepias foliosa (K.Schum.) Hiern
- Asclepias fournieri Woodson
- Asclepias fulva N.E.Br.

== G-L ==
- Asclepias galeottii E.Fourn.
- Asclepias gentryi Standl.
- Asclepias gibba (E.Mey.) Schltr.
- Asclepias glaucescens Kunth
- Asclepias gordon-grayae Nicholas
- Asclepias graminifolia (Wild) Goyder
- Asclepias grandirandii Goyder
- Asclepias graogramanii L.O.Alvarado, M.G.Chávez & J.A.Álvarez
- Asclepias hallii A.Gray
- Asclepias hirtella (Pennell) Woodson
- Asclepias humilis (E.Mey.) Schltr.
- Asclepias humistrata Walter
- Asclepias hypoleuca (A.Gray) Woodson
- Asclepias inaequalis Goyder
- Asclepias incarnata L.
- Asclepias involucrata Engelm. ex Torr.
- Asclepias jaliscana B.L.Rob.
- Asclepias jorgeana Fishbein & S.P.Lynch
- Asclepias kamerunensis Schltr.
- Asclepias × kansana Vail
- Asclepias labriformis M.E.Jones
- Asclepias lanceolata Walter
- Asclepias langsdorffii E.Fourn.
- Asclepias lanuginosa Nutt.
- Asclepias latifolia (Torr.) Raf.
- Asclepias lemmonii A.Gray
- Asclepias leptopus I.M.Johnst.
- Asclepias linaria Cav.
- Asclepias linearis Scheele
- Asclepias longifolia Michx.
- Asclepias longirostra Goyder
- Asclepias longissima (K.Schum.) N.E.Br.
- Asclepias lynchiana Fishbein

== M-O ==
- Asclepias macropus (Schltr.) Schltr.
- Asclepias macrotis Torr.
- Asclepias masonii Woodson
- Asclepias mcvaughii Woodson
- Asclepias meadii Torr. ex A.Gray
- Asclepias melantha Decne.
- Asclepias meliodora (Schltr.) Schltr.
- Asclepias mellodora A.St.-Hil.
- Asclepias mexicana Cav.
- Asclepias meyeriana (Schltr.) Schltr.
- Asclepias michauxii Decne.
- Asclepias minor (S.Moore) Goyder
- Asclepias minutiflora (Goyder) Goyder
- Asclepias mirifica Woodson
- Asclepias montevaga M.Glen, Nicholas & Bester
- Asclepias monticola N.E.Br.
- Asclepias mtorwiensis Goyder
- Asclepias nana I.Verd.
- Asclepias navicularis (E.Mey.) Schltr.
- Asclepias nivea L.
- Asclepias nummularia Torr.
- Asclepias nummularioides W.D.Stevens
- Asclepias nuttii N.E.Br.
- Asclepias nyctaginifolia A.Gray
- Asclepias obovata Elliott
- Asclepias occidentalis Goyder
- Asclepias oenotheroides Schltdl. & Cham.
- Asclepias oreophila Nicholas ex Hilliard & B.L.Burtt
- Asclepias otarioides E.Fourn.
- Asclepias ovalifolia Decne.
- Asclepias ovata M.Martens & Galeotti

== P-R ==
- Asclepias palustris (K.Schum.) Schltr.
- Asclepias patens N.E.Br.
- Asclepias pedicellata Walter
- Asclepias pellucida E.Fourn.
- Asclepias peltigera (E.Mey.) Schltr.
- Asclepias perennis Walter
- Asclepias pilgeriana Schltr.
- Asclepias praemorsa Schltr.
- Asclepias pratensis Benth.
- Asclepias pringlei (Greenm.) Woodson
- Asclepias prostrata W.H.Blackw.
- Asclepias pseudoamabilis Goyder
- Asclepias pseudofimbriata (Goyder) Goyder
- Asclepias pseudorubricaulis Woodson
- Asclepias puberula A.Gray
- Asclepias pumila (A.Gray) Vail
- Asclepias purpurascens L.
- Asclepias pygmaea N.E.Br.
- Asclepias quadrifolia Jacq.
- Asclepias quinquedentata A.Gray
- Asclepias randii S.Moore
- Asclepias rara N.E.Br.
- Asclepias rubra L.
- Asclepias rusbyi (Vail) Woodson
- Asclepias ruthiae Maguire

== S-Z ==
- Asclepias sanjuanensis K.D.Heil, J.M.Porter & S.L.Welsh
- Asclepias scaposa Vail
- Asclepias scheryi Woodson
- Asclepias schlechteri (K.Schum.) N.E.Br.
- Asclepias schumanniana Hiern
- Asclepias senecionifolia M.E.Jones
- Asclepias shabaensis (Goyder) Goyder
- Asclepias similis Hemsl.
- Asclepias solanoana Woodson
- Asclepias solstitialis A.Chev.
- Asclepias speciosa Torr.
- Asclepias sperryi Woodson
- Asclepias sphacelata (K.Schum.) N.E.Br.
- Asclepias standleyi Woodson
- Asclepias stathmostelmoides Goyder
- Asclepias stellifera Schltr.
- Asclepias stenophylla A.Gray
- Asclepias subaphylla Woodson
- Asclepias subulata Decne.
- Asclepias subverticillata (A.Gray) Vail
- Asclepias subviridis S.Moore
- Asclepias sullivantii Engelm. ex A.Gray
- Asclepias syriaca L.
- Asclepias tanganyikensis E.A.Bruce
- Asclepias texana A.Heller
- Asclepias tomentosa Elliott
- Asclepias tonkawae Duran et al.
- Asclepias tuberosa L.
- Asclepias ulophylla Schltr.
- Asclepias uncialis Greene
- Asclepias variegata L.
- Asclepias velutina (Schltr.) Schltr.
- Asclepias verticillata L.
- Asclepias vestita Hook. & Arn.
- Asclepias vicaria N.E.Br.
- Asclepias vinosa (E.Fourn.) Woodson
- Asclepias viridiflora Raf.
- Asclepias viridis Walter
- Asclepias viridula Chapm.
- Asclepias virletii E.Fourn.
- Asclepias welshii N.H.Holmgren & P.K.Holmgren
- Asclepias woodii (Schltr.) Schltr.
- Asclepias woodsoniana Standl. & Steyerm.
- Asclepias zanthodacryon (L.B.Sm.) Woodson

=== Former species ===
- Calotropis gigantea (L.) W.T.Aiton (as A. gigantea L.)
- Calotropis procera (Aiton) W.T.Aiton (as A. procera Aiton)
- Cynanchum louiseae Kartesz & Gandhi (as A. nigra L.)
- Cynanchum thesioides (Freyn) K.Schum. (as A. sibirica L.)
- Funastrum clausum (Jacq.) Schltr. (as A. clausa Jacq.)
- Gomphocarpus cancellatus (Burm.f.) Bruyns (as A. cancellatus Burm.f. or A. rotundifolia Mill.)
- Gomphocarpus fruticosus (L.) W.T.Aiton (as A. fruticosa L.)
- Marsdenia macrophylla (Humb. & Bonpl. ex Willd.) E.Fourn. (as A. macrophylla Humb. & Bonpl. ex Schult.)
- Marsdenia tenacissima (Roxb.) Moon (as A. tenacissima Roxb.)
- Matelea maritima (Jacq.) Woodson (as A. maritima Jacq.)
- Sarcostemma acidum (Roxb.) Voigt (as A. acida Roxb.)
- Sarcostemma viminale (L.) R.Br. (as A. viminalis (L.) Steud.)
- Telosma cordata (Burm.f.) Merr. (as A. cordata Burm.f.)
- Telosma pallida (Roxb.) Craib (as A. pallida Roxb.)
- Tylophora indica (Burm.f.) Merr. (as A. asthmatica L.f.)
- Vincetoxicum hirundinaria Medik. (as A. vincetoxicum L.)
- Vincetoxicum pycnostelma Kitag. (as A. paniculata Bunge)
- Xysmalobium undulatum (L.) R.Br. (as A. undulata L.)
