= Emoryi =

Emoryi may refer to:

- Animals
  - Apalone spinifera emoryi, a subspecies of softshell turtle
  - Asclepias emoryi, a flowering milkweed plant
  - Pantherophis emoryi, the Great Plains rat snake
- Plants
  - Cacti
    - Bergerocactus emoryi, the golden-spined cereus
    - Ferocactus emoryi, a species of barrel cactus
    - Grusonia emoryi, a species of cactus in the Grusonia genus
  - Other plants
    - Carex emoryi, the riverbank tussock sedge or Emory's sedge, a plant species
    - Castela emoryi, the Crucifixion thorn, a shrub species native to the Mojave and Sonoran Deserts
    - Condea emoryi, the desert lavender plant
    - Perityle emoryi, a flowering plant in the Astor family
    - Psorothamnus emoryi, a flowering shrub species
    - Quercus emoryi, a species of oak tree
    - Sphaeralcea emoryi, a flowering plant in the mallow family
