= Woolly milkweed =

Woolly milkweed may refer to several species of plants:

- Woolly milkweed, Asclepias lanuginosa, native to the upper Midwest United States and Canada
- Woolly milkweed, Asclepias vestita, endemic to California, United States
- Woolly pod milkweed, Asclepias eriocarpa, native to the southwest United States and northwest Mexico
