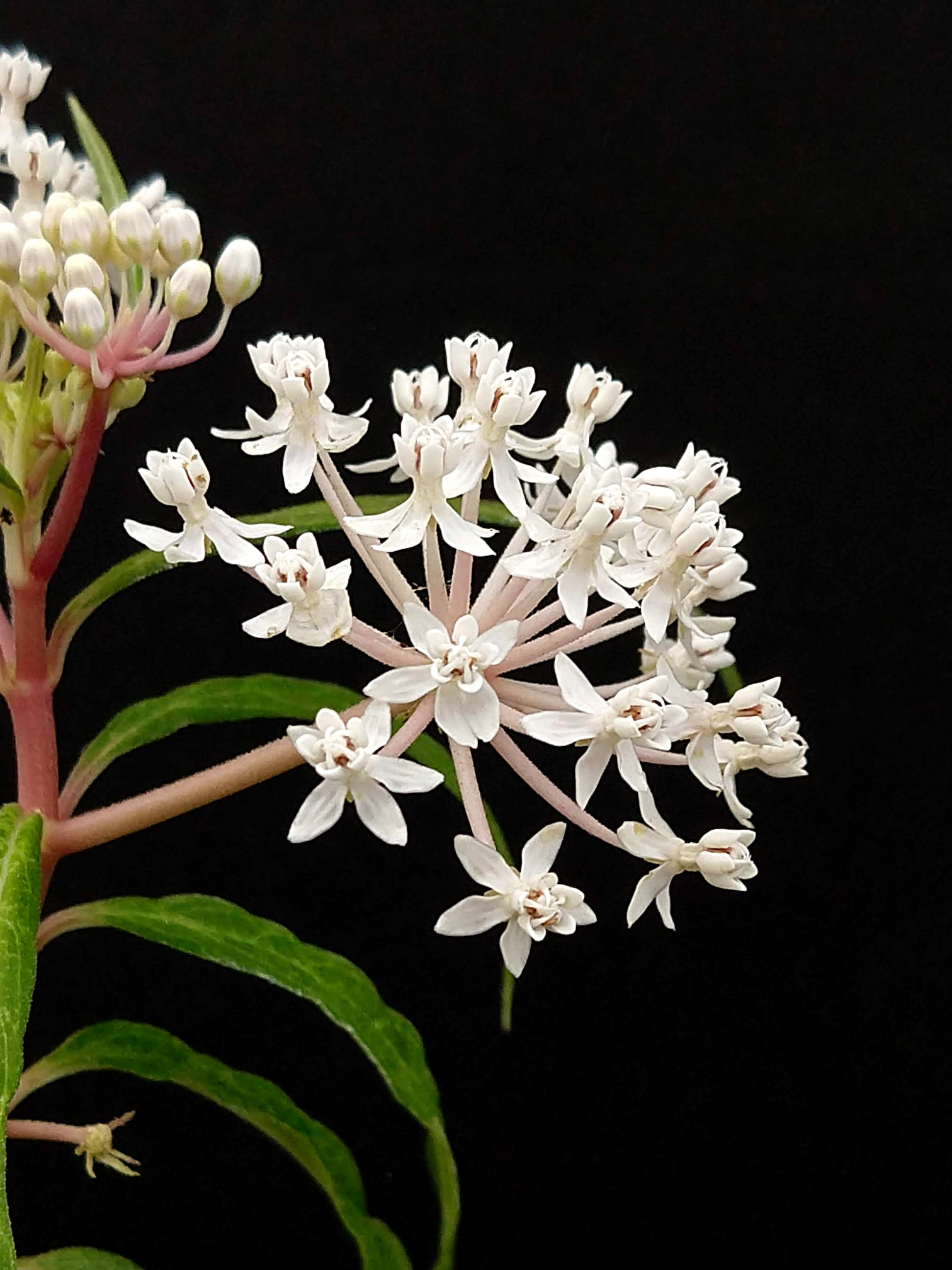

Scientific classification
- Kingdom: Plantae
- Clade: Tracheophytes
- Clade: Angiosperms
- Clade: Eudicots
- Clade: Asterids
- Order: Gentianales
- Family: Apocynaceae
- Genus: Asclepias
- Species: A. perennis

Binomial name
- Asclepias perennis Walter

= Asclepias perennis =

Species of plant

Asclepias perennis, also known as aquatic milkweed or white swamp milkweed (not to be confused with swamp milkweed; Asclepias incarnata), is a North American species of milkweed that is found throughout the Coastal Plain from eastern Texas to southern South Carolina, northward along the Mississippi River, and into the Ohio Valley of Illinois, Indiana, and Kentucky. There seems to be a few disjunct populations in Arkansas, Texas, and Indiana.

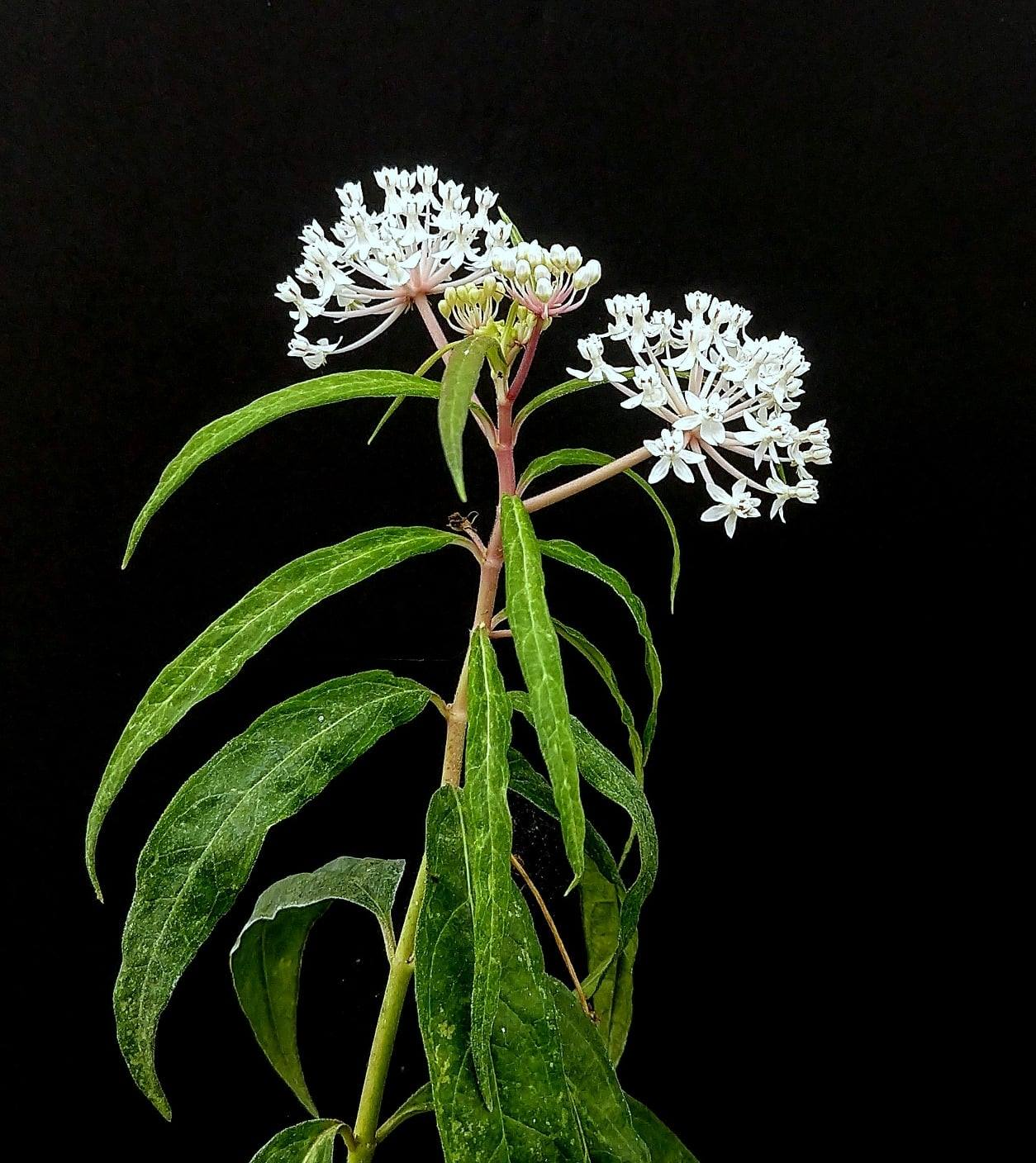
Asclepias perennis - Grown by Pat Mahon

A similar species, Asclepias texana, looks morphologically similar but differs by a very divided distribution (central and western Texas), growing in dry rocky soils, and having more broadly ovate leaves.

== Description ==
The aquatic milkweed is a cold-hardy herbaceous perennial that forms a strong fibrous (sometimes woody) rootstock, growing to 46–61 cm (18–24 in) in height. The lateral stems arise from the main stem, and can be many.

Leaves - opposite, linear to narrowly lanceolate to elliptical, glabrous, 8–13 cm (3.1–5.1 in) in length, 1–4 cm (0.39–1.57 in) in width, dull green adaxial, lighter green abaxial, petioles to 1.5 cm (0.59 in) in length; Inflorescence - 2 cm (0.79 in) in length, erect umbel, single peduncle per node, with one or more peduncles per stem, terminal and axillary, rays of inflorescence subtended by linear bracts 2–4 mm (0.079–0.157 in) in length, 1 mm (0.039 in) in width, sparsely pubescent, having involucre, with 25+ flowers per peduncle; Flowers - 2 mm (0.079 in) in diameter and 3–4 mm (0.12–0.16 in) in length, pedicels 1 cm (0.39 in), horns extend beyond the hoods, corollas reflexed, flower color ranges from whitish to pink; Pods - follicles 4–7 cm (1.6–2.8 in) in length, pendent, ovate to broadly elliptic-ovate, surface smooth, glabrous; Seeds - c. 12–17 mm (0.47–0.67 in) in length, margins broadly winged, coma absent.

== Ecology ==
Found in low wet woods, cypress swamps, lake and pond margins, slow streams, and wet ditches. Native substrate is typically organic-rich and saturated. It can thrive in partial sun to full sun. This species is secure, and found in 13 states. The Aquatic Milkweed has adapted to disperse seed by water, as the seeds float and lack the comas utilized by other milkweeds to disperse by air. It is a known host plant for the Monarch Butterfly. Blooms May - September.

== Cultivation ==
The aquatic milkweed is commercially available by both seed and propagated plants. Seed readily germinates, and mature flowering plants can be grown in as little as three to four months. Plants can be successfully grown in containers as small as a quart, and amount of stems increases with size of container. This species thrives with an abundance of water, in which substrate should retain good moisture levels and rarely, if ever, dry out. Cold hardiness has been noted to −23 °C.
