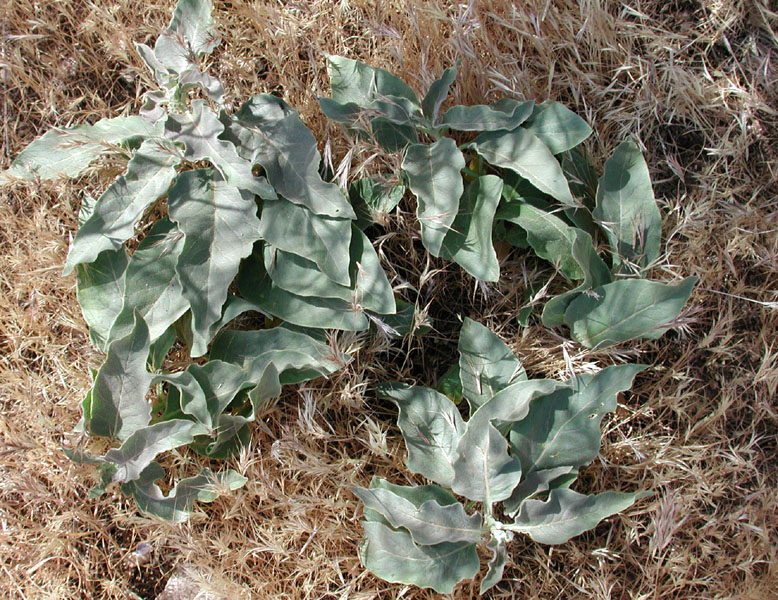

Scientific classification
- Kingdom: Plantae
- Clade: Tracheophytes
- Clade: Angiosperms
- Clade: Eudicots
- Clade: Asterids
- Order: Gentianales
- Family: Apocynaceae
- Genus: Asclepias
- Species: A. nyctaginifolia

Binomial name
- Asclepias nyctaginifolia A.Gray

= Asclepias nyctaginifolia =

Species of flowering plant

Asclepias nyctaginifolia is a species of milkweed known by the common name Mojave milkweed. It is native to the southwestern United States from California to New Mexico, where it grows mainly in desert habitat. A perennial herb it grows up to about half a meter in height when erect, but often bends or droops. The thick leaves are oval to lance-shaped and arranged in opposite pairs about the stem. The leaves and stem are generally slightly hairy. The inflorescence is a dense umbel up to 8 centimeters wide and packed with pink-tinted pale green flowers. The fruit is a large follicle up to 9 centimeters long.

== See also ==
- List of Asclepias species
