= Asclepias brevicuspis =

Scientific classification
- Kingdom: Plantae
- Clade: Tracheophytes
- Clade: Angiosperms
- Clade: Eudicots
- Clade: Asterids
- Order: Gentianales
- Family: Apocynaceae
- Genus: Asclepias
- Species: A. brevicuspis

Binomial name
- Asclepias brevicuspis (E.Mey.) Schltr.

Synonyms
- Gomphocarpus brevicuspis (E.Mey.) D.Dietr.; Lagarinthus brevicuspis E.Mey.

Species of flowering plant

Asclepias brevicuspis is a species of flowering plant in the Asclepias genus and Apocynaceae family that grows in South Africa. A perennial, it grows in a subtropical biome.

A specimen of it was collected by W. T. Gerrard in the Natal in 1865.

== See also ==
- List of Asclepias species
- List of Apocynaceae of South Africa
