= Asclepias candida =

Scientific classification
- Kingdom: Plantae
- Clade: Tracheophytes
- Clade: Angiosperms
- Clade: Eudicots
- Clade: Asterids
- Order: Gentianales
- Family: Apocynaceae
- Genus: Asclepias
- Species: A. candida

Binomial name
- Asclepias candida Vell.

Synonyms
- Asclepias aequicornu E.Fourn.; Asclepias blanchetii E.Fourn.; Asclepias campestris Decne.; Asclepias marginata Decne.; Asclepias multinervis E.Fourn.; Asclepias pallida E.Fourn.; Asclepias selloana E.Fourn.

Species of flowering plant

Asclepias candida is a flowering plant in the genus Asclepias and family Apocynaceae. It grows in Argentina, Bolivia, Paraguay, and Uruguay. A specimen of it was collected in 1840.

== See also ==
- List of Asclepias species
