= Asclepias graogramanii =

Scientific classification
- Kingdom: Plantae
- Clade: Tracheophytes
- Clade: Angiosperms
- Clade: Eudicots
- Clade: Asterids
- Order: Gentianales
- Family: Apocynaceae
- Genus: Asclepias
- Species: A. graogramanii

Binomial name
- Asclepias graogramanii L.O.Alvarado, M.G.Chávez & J.A.Álvarez

Species of flowering plant

Asclepias graogramanii is a species of flowering plant in the family Apocynaceae. It is a perennial herb with pink and white flowers, and rod-shaped fruits. The species is native to southwest Mexico, and was described in 2023.

== Taxonomy ==
Asclepias graogramanii was described by Leonardo Osvaldo Alvarado-Cárdenas, María Guadalupe Chávez-Hernández, and Julio Alejandro Álvarez-Ruiz in 2023.

== Distribution ==
Asclepias graogramanii is native to the seasonally dry tropical biome of Nayarit and Jalisco, southwest Mexico. It grows in pine–oak forest, xerophytic scrub, and beside roads, at elevations of 900–1,106 metres (2,953–3,629 ft). The species is present in the La Primavera Biosphere Reserve.

== Description ==
Asclepias graogramanii is a perennial herb that grows 30–80 centimetres (12–31 in) tall. The leaves are oblong to lanceolate, arranged oppositely, and in six to ten pairs. The leaves are 6.1–12.2 centimetres (2.4–4.8 in) long, and 2.7–3.9 centimetres (1.1–1.5 in) wide. The leaf edges are smooth.

The inflorescence consists of one to three umbels, each of which has fourteen to twenty flowers. The inflorescence grows on a 5.6–9.6 centimetres (2.2–3.8 in) stem, and the flowers grow on 1.4–2.8 centimetres (0.55–1.10 in) stems. The calyx has green, ovate-lanceolate lobes, which are 3–4.2 millimetres (0.12–0.17 in) long, and 1.2–2 millimetres (0.047–0.079 in) wide. The corolla lobes are ovate, pink to whitish-pink, 5–8 millimetres (0.20–0.31 in) long, and 3–5 millimetres (0.12–0.20 in) wide. The corona is composed of five pink or purple, cucullate segments. The plant flowers from April to July.

The fruits are rod-shaped follicles that measure 9–15 centimetres (3.5–5.9 in) long. The plant fruits from May to October.

Asclepias graogramanii is similar to Asclepias glaucescens.

== Ecology ==
Asclepias graogramanii is visited by ants and the western honey bee. It is parasitised by Aphis nerii and milkweed bugs.

== Etymology ==
The specific epithet graogramanii refers to Graograman, a multi-coloured lion from the novel The Neverending Story. The name refers to the species' colourful flowers.
