= Asclepias conzattii =

Scientific classification
- Kingdom: Plantae
- Clade: Tracheophytes
- Clade: Angiosperms
- Clade: Eudicots
- Clade: Asterids
- Order: Gentianales
- Family: Apocynaceae
- Genus: Asclepias
- Species: A. conzattii

Binomial name
- Asclepias conzattii Woodson

Species of flowering plant

Asclepias conzattii is a flowering plant species in the milkweed genus Asclepias that grows in northern Oaxaca, Mexico. In 1920, C. Conzatti collected a specimen of it that is held at the National Herbarium of Mexico.

== See also ==
- List of Asclepias species
