= Asclepias auriculata =

Scientific classification
- Kingdom: Plantae
- Clade: Tracheophytes
- Clade: Angiosperms
- Clade: Eudicots
- Clade: Asterids
- Order: Gentianales
- Family: Apocynaceae
- Genus: Asclepias
- Species: A. auriculata

Binomial name
- Asclepias auriculata Kunth

Synonyms
- Otaria auriculata; Asclepias fragrans; Asclepias mazatlanensis; Asclepias purpusii; Otaria fragrans

Species of flowering

Asclepias auriculata, the eared milkweed, is a species of perennial milkweed endemic to El Salvador, Guatemala, and Mexico. It grows in the seasonally dry tropical biome. It is in the family Apocynaceae.
