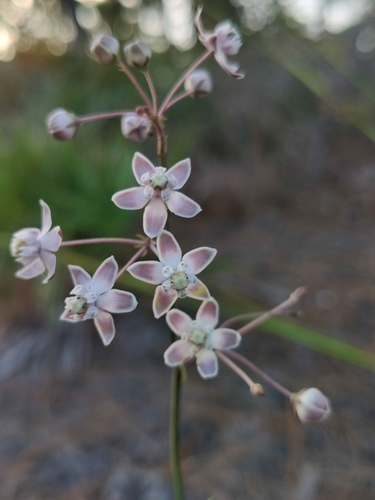

Conservation status
- Apparently Secure (NatureServe)

Scientific classification
- Kingdom: Plantae
- Clade: Tracheophytes
- Clade: Angiosperms
- Clade: Eudicots
- Clade: Asterids
- Order: Gentianales
- Family: Apocynaceae
- Genus: Asclepias
- Species: A. cinerea

Binomial name
- Asclepias cinerea Walter
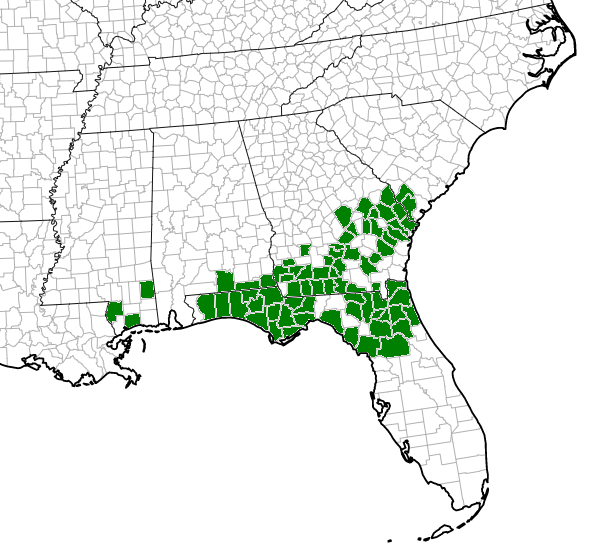

= Asclepias cinerea =

Carolina milkweed

Species of milkweed

Asclepias cinerea, also known as Carolina milkweed or ashy milkweed, is a herbaceous perennial plant species in the genus Asclepias. It is native to the United States where its range is concentrated in the Southeast.

== Etymology ==
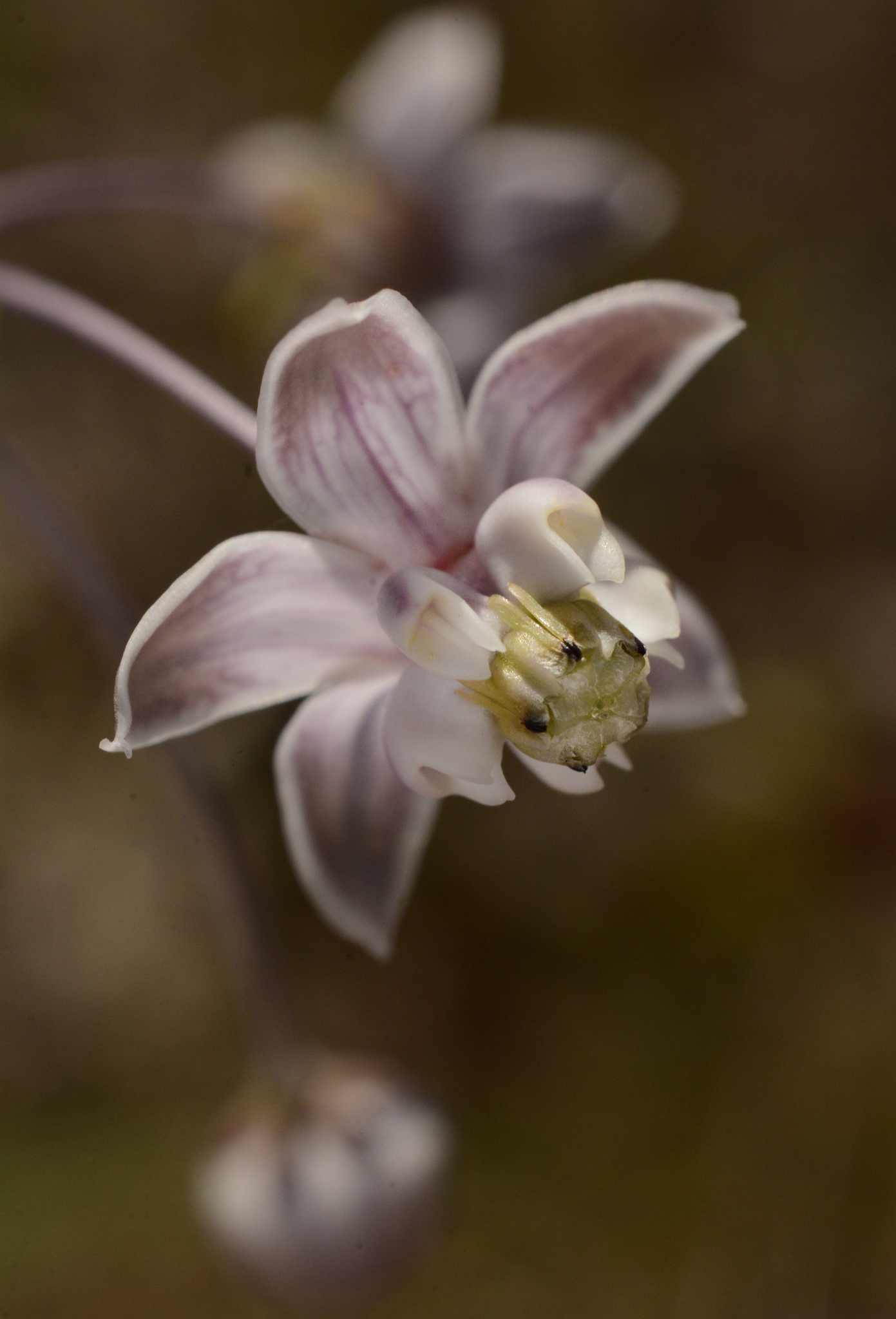
Flower

The genus Ascelpias is named after the Ancient Greek god of medicine, Asclepius. The specific epithet, cinerea, is from the Latin cinereus, meaning ash-colored or ash-gray. The common name, milkweed, comes from the white, milky latex that the plant secretes when the stem or leaves are injured.

== Description ==
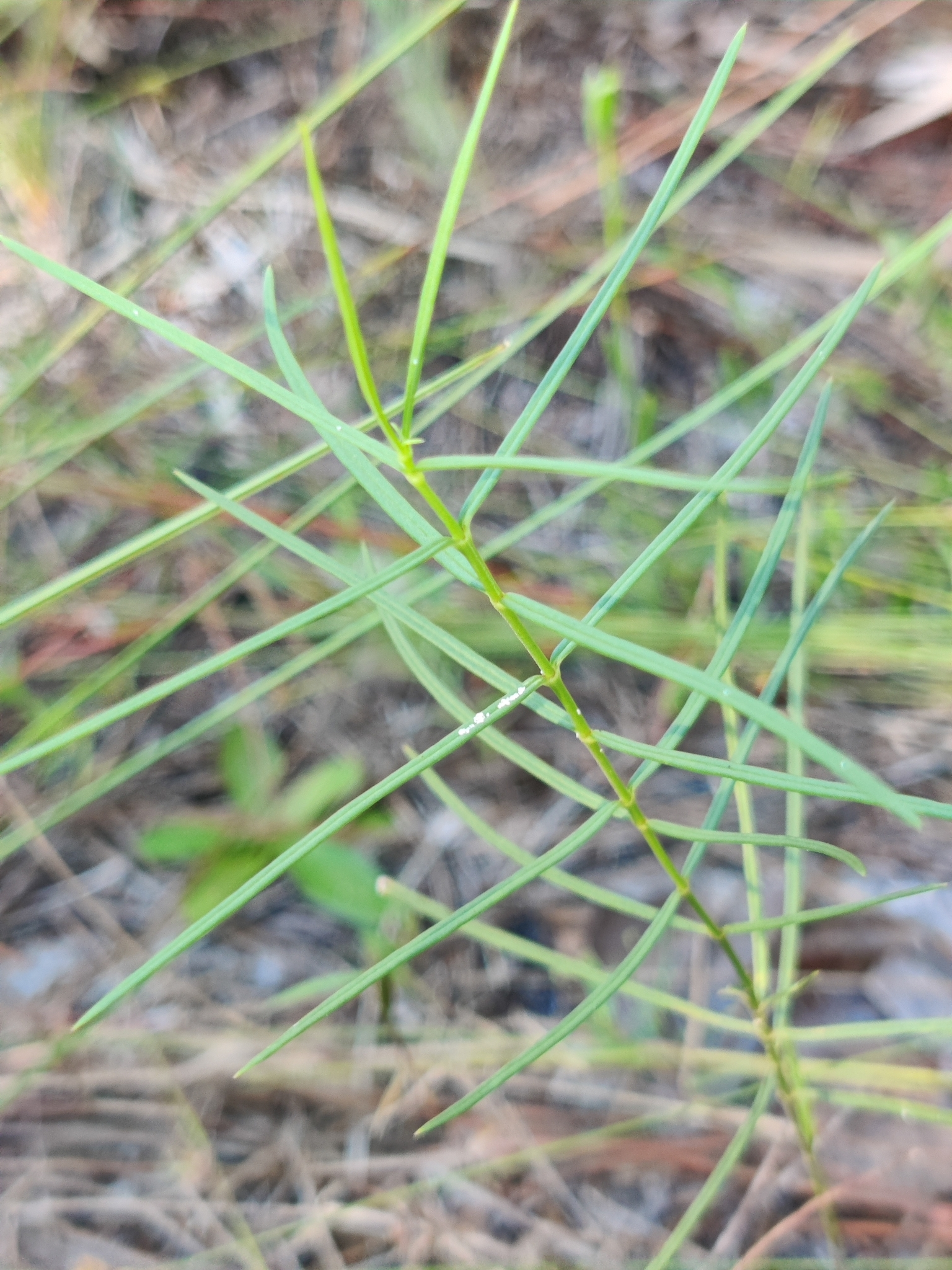
A. cinerea leaves

Asclepias cinerea is a perennial herb that is grass-like in appearance with a thin, smooth stem that reaches 2 ft (0.61 m) in height. Leaves are 2 to 4 in (51 to 102 mm) long, linear, narrow, glabrous, and oppositely arranged. Flowers are sparse and loosely arranged in axillary or terminal umbels. Each flower has a five-lobed corolla (petals) that are flat or reflexed and range from ashy-gray, pale violet, to pale rose. The fruit is a follicle that is smooth, slender, and 3 to 4 in (76 to 102 mm) long. When the follicle matures, it splits open releasing seeds. Each seed has white fluffy hairs (pappus) attached that aid in wind dispersal.

== Distribution and habitat ==
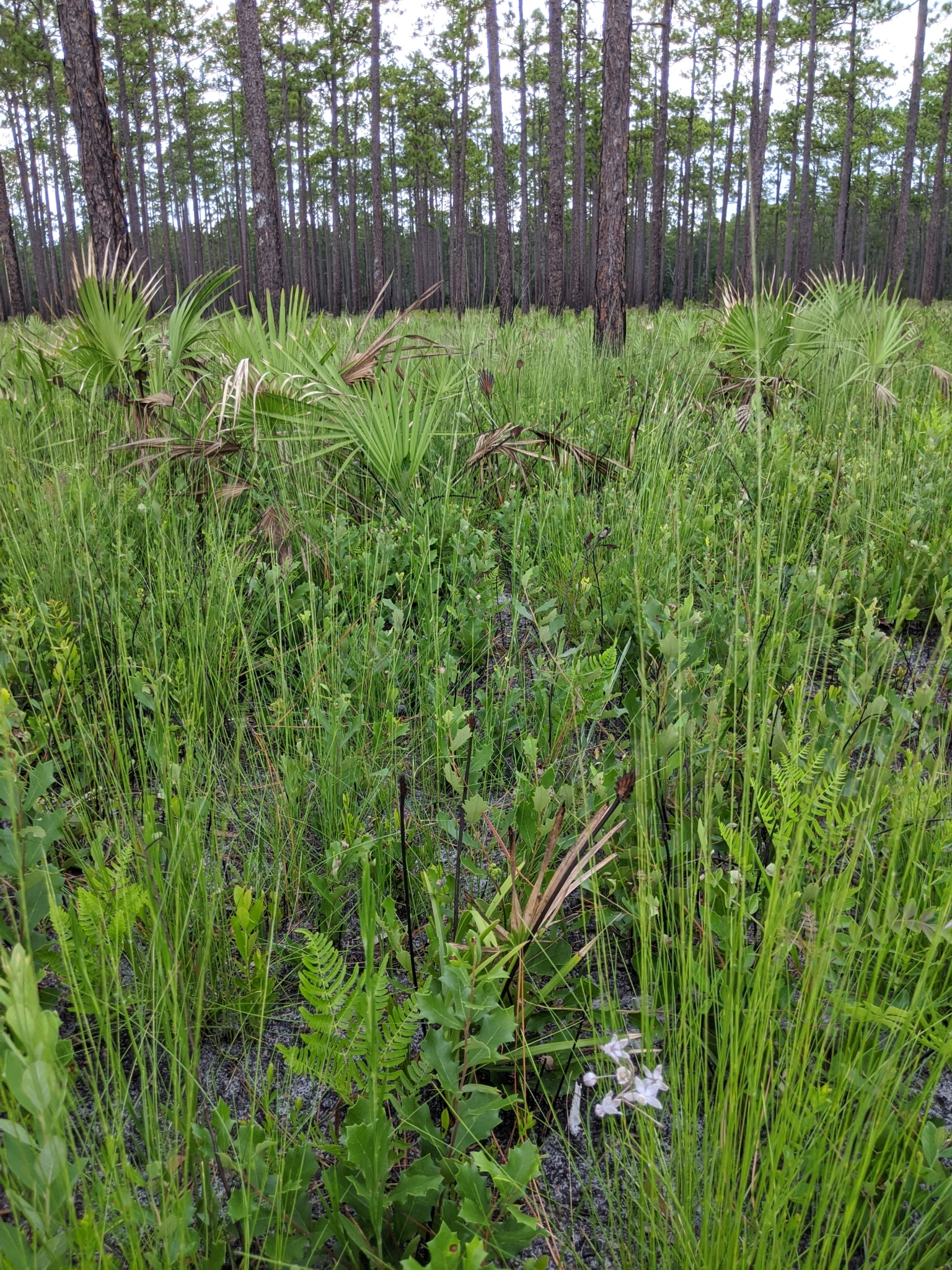
A. cinerea in mesic flatwoods

This species is found in the Southeastern Coastal Plain from eastern South Carolina, down to the Florida panhandle, and west to southern Mississippi. It was also historically found in North Carolina, but is now extirpated. Its native habitats include pine-wiregrass savannas, flatwoods, sandhills, bogs, and pine-scrub oak ridges.

This species may grow in a range of light levels (varying from shade to full sun), as well as within a variety of sandy soils (including but not limited to: loamy sand, boggy soils, sandy peat, and Penney and Ridgewood soil types).

== Ecology ==
=== Phenology ===
A. cinerea has been observed to flower from spring into summer, with fruiting being observed throughout the summer months.

=== Pollination and herbivory ===
Like other milkweed species, A. cinerea is a host plant for the monarch (Danaus plexippus) and queen (Danaus gilippus) butterflies. It is also an important nectar source for other butterflies, bees, wasps, and beetles.

== Conservation status ==
A. cinerea is listed as an S1 species (Critically Imperiled) by NatureServe in Alabama and South Carolina. Globally it is listed as a G4 species (Apparently Secure), which means there is a fairly low risk of extinction, but there is possible cause for some concerns due to local recent declines, threats, or other factors.
