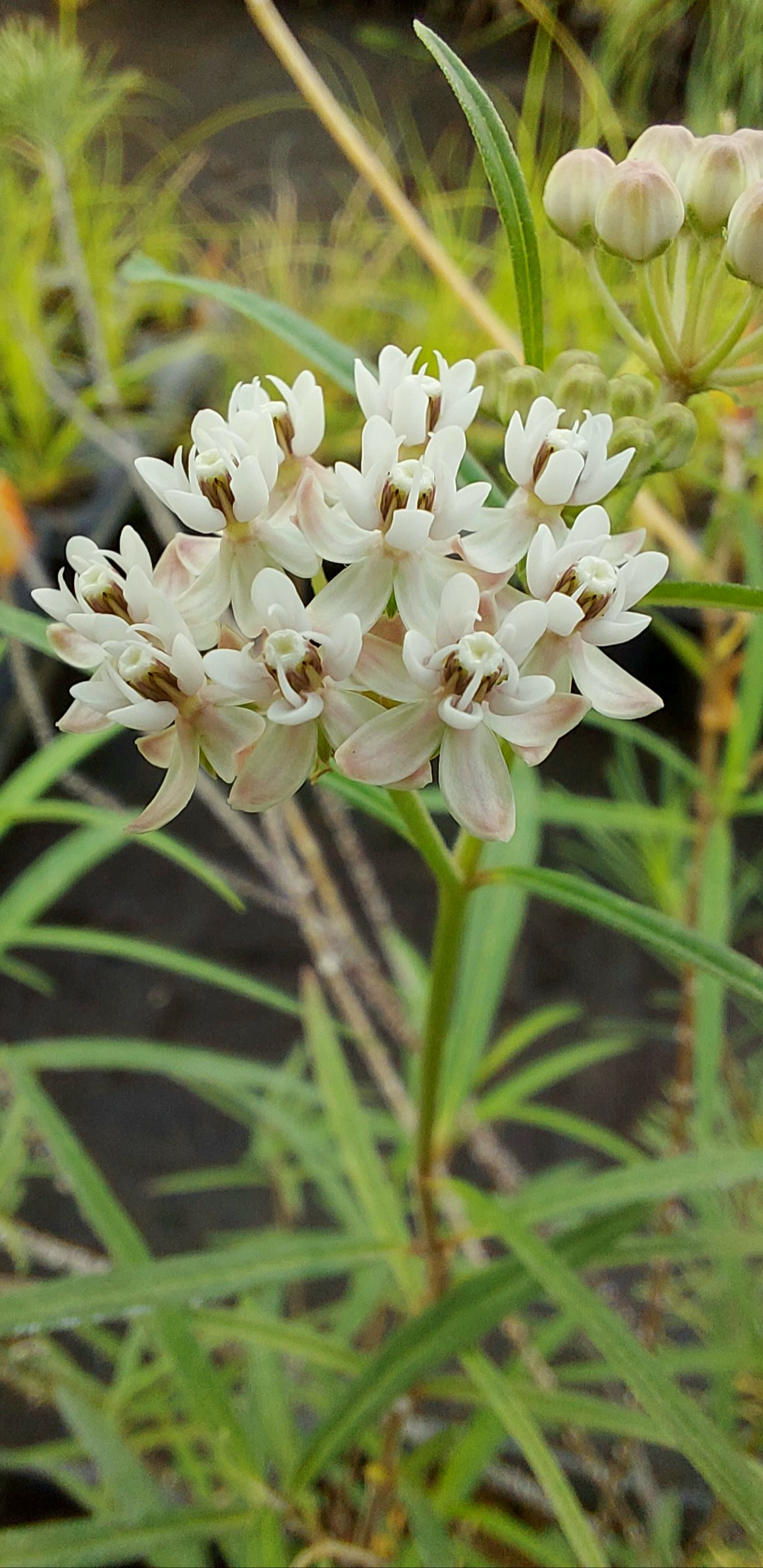

Scientific classification
- Kingdom: Plantae
- Clade: Embryophytes
- Clade: Tracheophytes
- Clade: Spermatophytes
- Clade: Angiosperms
- Clade: Eudicots
- Clade: Asterids
- Order: Gentianales
- Family: Apocynaceae
- Genus: Asclepias
- Species: A. angustifolia

Binomial name
- Asclepias angustifolia Schweigg.

= Asclepias angustifolia =

Species of flowering plant

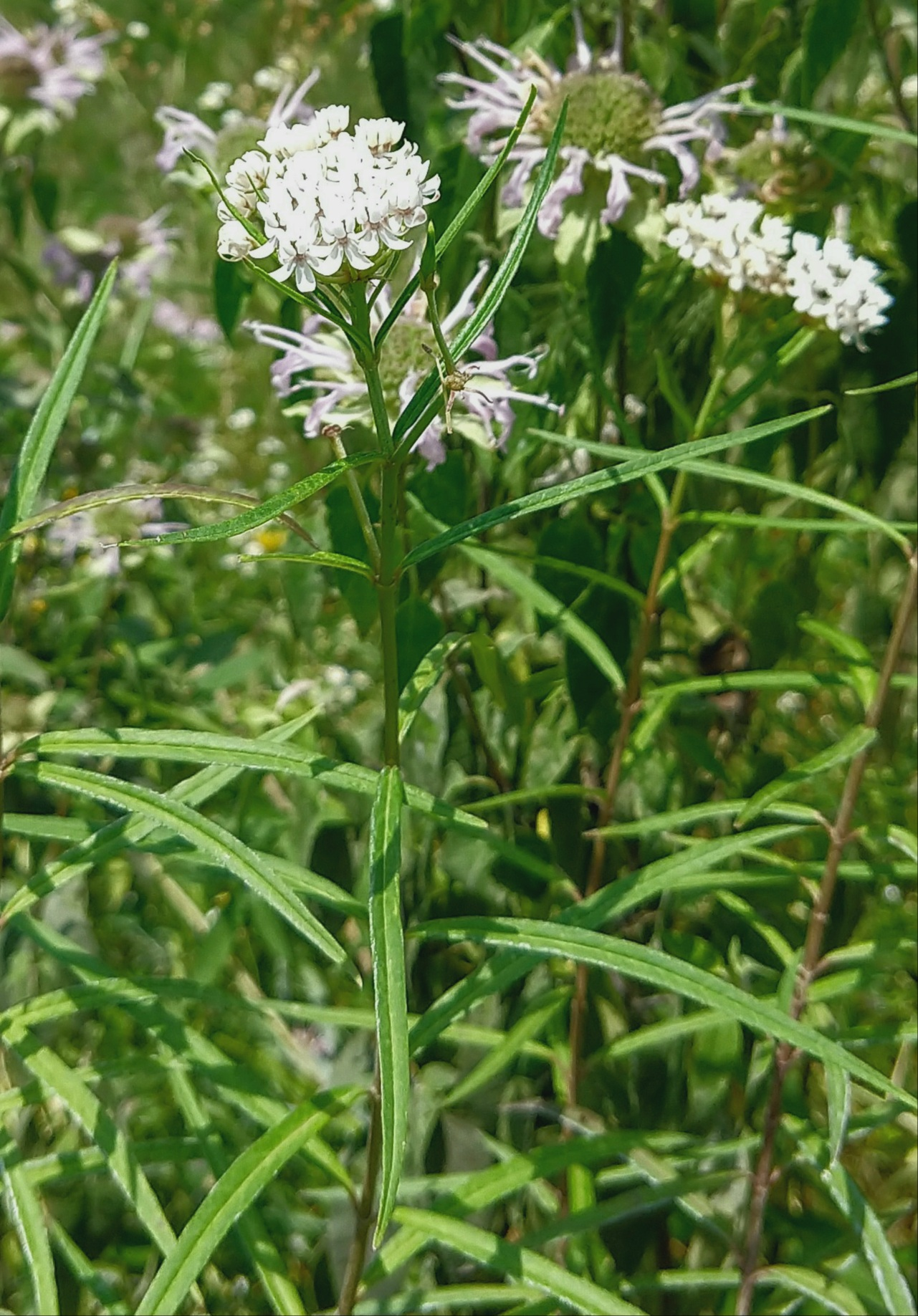
Asc. angustifolia

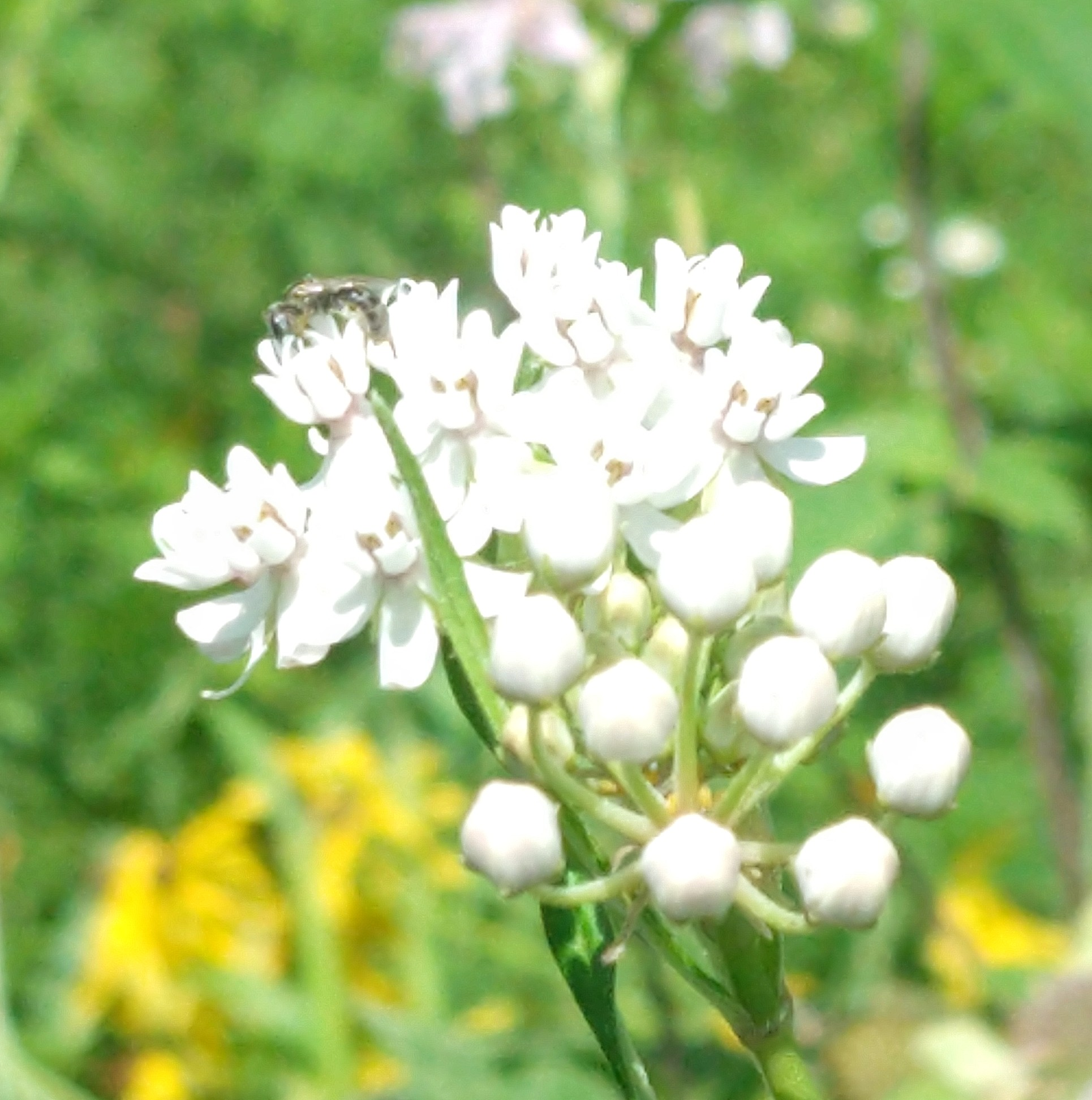
A. angustifolia, with known pollinator Ceratina sp. - Pat Mahon 2020

Asclepias angustifolia, commonly called the Arizona milkweed, is a species of milkweed native in the USA only in Arizona.

== Description ==
The Arizona milkweed is an herbaceous perennial that forms a taproot, growing to 28 in (71 cm) in height. The stems arise from a single crown, and can be many.

Leaves - opposite, linear with short petioles, glabrous, 4–12 cm (1.6–4.7 in) in length, 2–11 mm (0.079–0.433 in) in width; Inflorescence - 2–4 cm (0.79–1.57 in), erect umbel, single peduncle per node, with one or more peduncles per stem, typically borne towards the top of the stem; Flowers - 3 mm (0.12 in) in diameter and in length, pedicels 5 mm (0.20 in), horns extend beyond the hoods, corollas reflexed, flower color ranges from whitish to pink; Pods - slender, upright, 3.5–9 cm (1.4–3.5 in) long, containing few to many seeds; Seeds - ca. 4mm in length, attached to white silky coma c. 4 mm (0.16 in) in length.

== Ecology ==
Found at higher elevations (around 1,050 to 2,100 metres [3,440 to 6,890 ft]), it is known in the USA only from Pima, Santa Cruz, and Cochise counties in Arizona, United States. Native substrate mostly consists of dry rocky soils. Habit includes riparian woodlands, floodplain meadows, cienega edges, canyons, and arroyo bottoms. It is considered rare in Arizona, and restricted to the borderlands. This species is a known host plant to the Monarch Butterfly. Because it serves as a nesting ground for the Monarch's larvae, it is a vital component in preventing the extinction of these butterflies. It has been observed to be pollinated by small species of Carpenter Bees (Ceratina sp.).

== Cultivation ==
The Arizona milkweed is commercially available by both seed and propagated plants. Seed readily germinates, and mature flowering plants can be grown in as little as three months. Plants can be successfully grown in containers as small as a quart. This species is tolerant of excess watering and lack of watering, in which substrate has not been seen to be an important factor in growth. Substrates utilized have been both organic-rich and replacement to sandy loam profiles. Cold hardiness has been noted to −12 °C (10 °F).

== Pollination ==
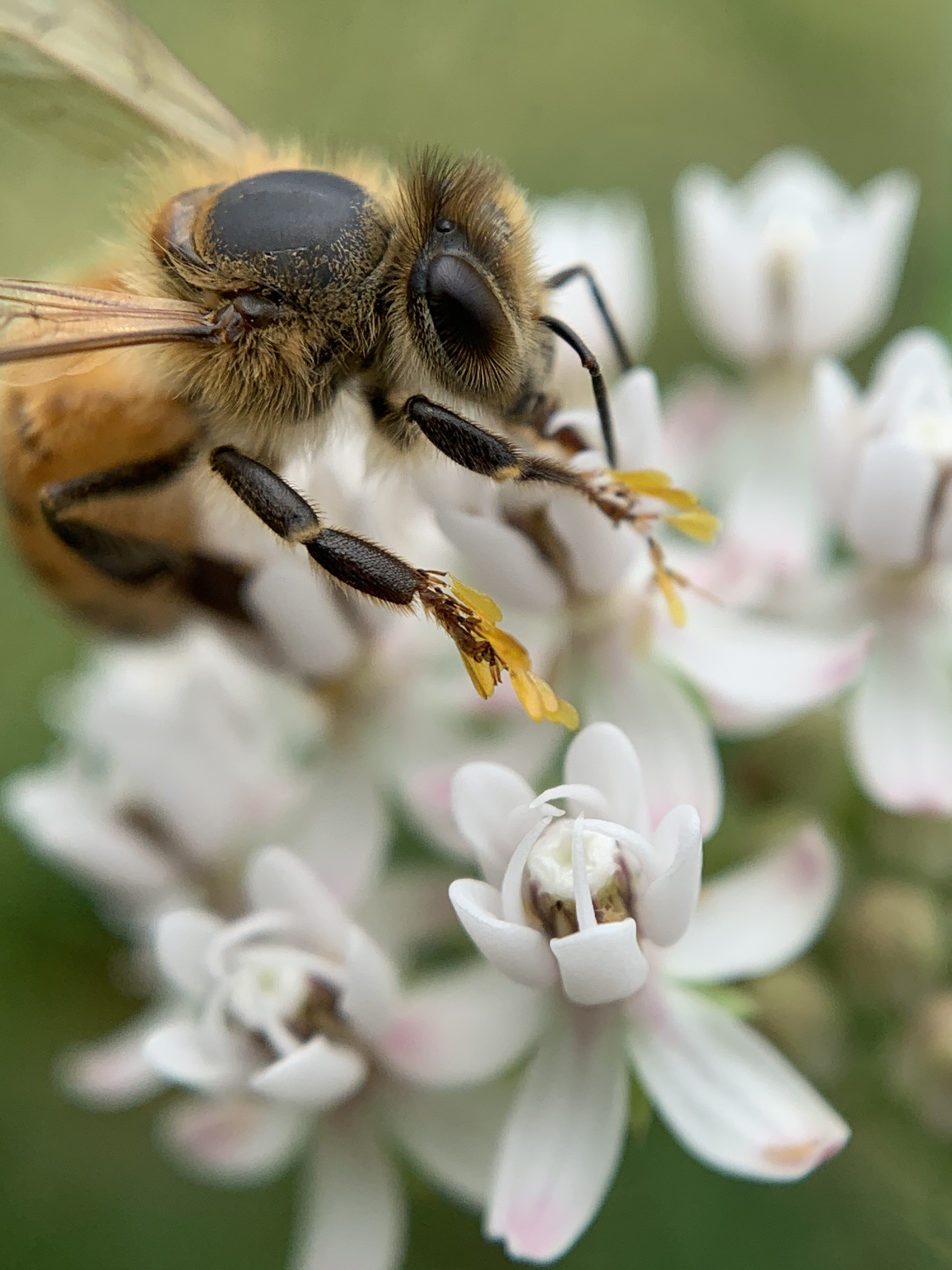
Pollination of Asclepias angustifolia

Asclepias angustifolia pollination is performed mechanically by insects.
