= Asclepias circinalis =

Scientific classification
- Kingdom: Plantae
- Clade: Embryophytes
- Clade: Tracheophytes
- Clade: Spermatophytes
- Clade: Angiosperms
- Clade: Eudicots
- Clade: Asterids
- Order: Gentianales
- Family: Apocynaceae
- Genus: Asclepias
- Species: A. circinalis

Binomial name
- Asclepias circinalis (Decne.) Woodson

Synonyms
- Acerates circinalis

Species of flowering plant

Asclepias circinalis is a species of perennial milkweed that is endemic to Mexico. It grows primarily in the seasonally dry tropical biome. It is in the family Apocynaceae. It was described by Woodson in 1941.
