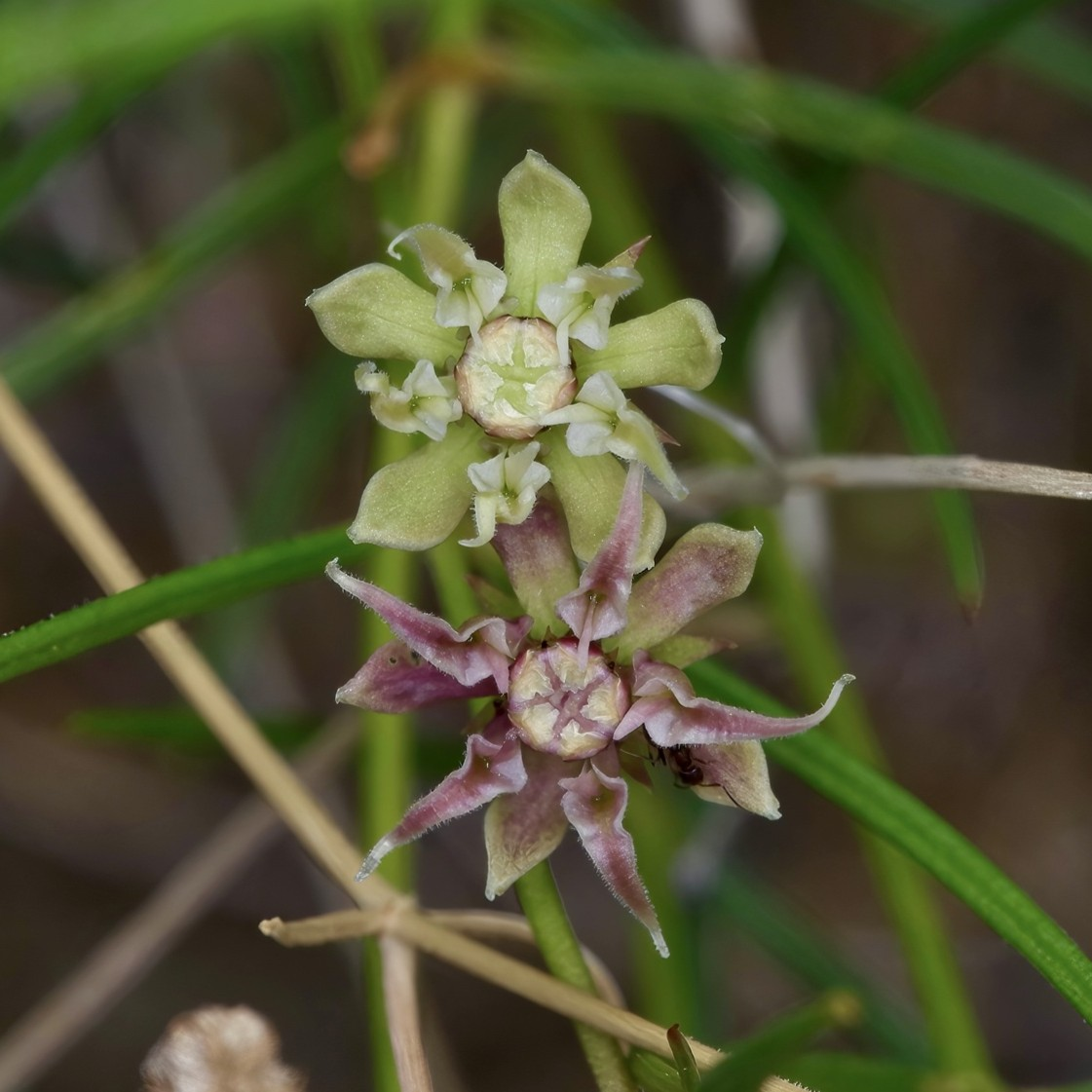
- North of Los Cerrillos, Santa Fe County, New Mexico

Conservation status
- Apparently Secure (NatureServe)

Scientific classification
- Kingdom: Plantae
- Clade: Embryophytes
- Clade: Tracheophytes
- Clade: Spermatophytes
- Clade: Angiosperms
- Clade: Eudicots
- Clade: Asterids
- Order: Gentianales
- Family: Apocynaceae
- Genus: Asclepias
- Species: A. macrotis

Binomial name
- Asclepias macrotis Torr.

= Asclepias macrotis =

Plant species in the milkweed family

Asclepias macrotis, commonly longhorn milkweed or longhood milkweed, is a milkweed from the south central United States and northern Mexico.

== Description ==
Longhorn milkweeds resemble a dwarfed shrubby ephedra with its many repeatedly branching stems. They grow to a height of 10 to 35 centimeters (4–14 in) and have tiny curved hairs that may nearly cover the stems or be very sparse. Underground it has a woody root.

The leaves are threadlike, just 0.5–1.5 millimeters wide, with a length of 2.5–7 cm (1.0–2.8 in). They attach directly to the main stems at the base of the leaf and their edges roll downwards towards the back of the leaf.

The umbels can have two to seven flowers and are found growing from nodes on upper parts of the stems by peduncles 0 to 0.8 cm long. The five lobes of the flower petals can be somewhat purple tinged to pale green; each one measuring 4–5 millimeters long with a pointed end.

== Taxonomy ==
Asclepias macrotis was scientifically described and named by John Torrey in 1859. It is classified in the genus Asclepias as part of the Apocynaceae family and has no subspecies or botanical synonyms.

=== Names ===
The Botanical Latin species name, macrotis, is derived from the Greek μακρός (makrós), meaning long. This is a reference to the large, spreading hoods on the flowers. Asclepias macrotis is similarly known by the common name longhorn milkweed for the way the hoods on the flowers with a resemblance to the horns of a Texas Longhorn. It is also called longhood milkweed, long-hood milkweed, and big-ear milkweed.

== Range and habitat ==
The native range for the longhorn milkweed is in northern Mexico and the south-central to southwestern United States. In Mexico it is native to three states, Sonora, Chihuahua, and Coahuila. In north of the border it grows in southernmost Arizona in Pima, Santa Cruz, and Cochise counties. To the east in New Mexico it is found in three counties in the southeast and six counties in the northwest. In Texas it is native to far west in Hudspeth and Culberson counties and also in Deaf Smith County in the Texas Panhandle. North of this it only recorded in Cimarron County, Oklahoma at the far western end of the state. It only grows in southeastern Colorado in Baca, Las Animas, and Otero counties.

The species can be found in habitats with oaks, pine-oak woodlands, juniper woods, and pinyon–juniper woodlands, shrubby grasslands, desert grasslands, and open prairies. It grows at elevations of 1,100–2,200 meters (3,600–7,200 ft) in well drained gravelly or sandy soils or from cracks in rock outcrops.
