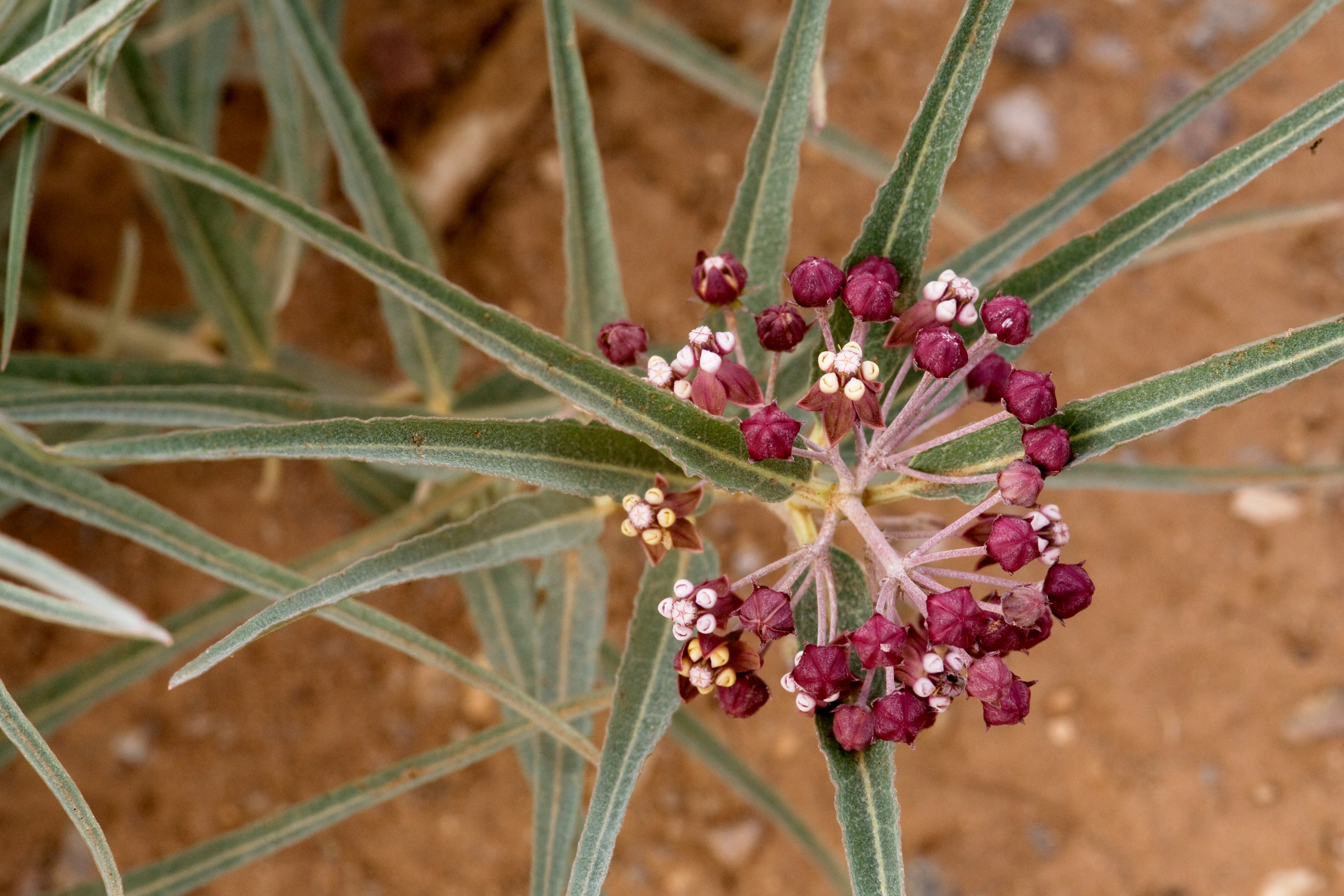

Scientific classification
- Kingdom: Plantae
- Clade: Embryophytes
- Clade: Tracheophytes
- Clade: Spermatophytes
- Clade: Angiosperms
- Clade: Eudicots
- Clade: Asterids
- Order: Gentianales
- Family: Apocynaceae
- Genus: Asclepias
- Species: A. brachystephana

Binomial name
- Asclepias brachystephana Engelm. ex Torr.

Synonyms
- Asclepiodora circinalis

= Asclepias brachystephana =

Species of plant

Asclepias brachystephana, or bract milkweed, is a species of perennial milkweed native to southeast Arizona to Texas and north and west Mexico. It grows in the desert or dry shrubland biome.
