= Asclepias alpestris =

Scientific classification
- Kingdom: Plantae
- Clade: Tracheophytes
- Clade: Angiosperms
- Clade: Eudicots
- Clade: Asterids
- Order: Gentianales
- Family: Apocynaceae
- Genus: Asclepias
- Species: A. alpestris

Binomial name
- Asclepias alpestris (K.Schum.) Goyder (2009)

Synonyms
- Homotypic Synonyms: Pachycarpus albens E.Mey.; Xysmalobium albens ((K.Schum.) Goyder; Heterotypic Synonyms: Asclepias affinis (Schltr.) Schltr.; Gomphocarpus affinis Schltr.

Species of flowering plant

Asclepias alpestris is a species of widespread, perennial flowering plant in the family Apocynaceae. This milkweed is endemic to southwest Tanzania. It grows in the seasonally dry, tropical biome. It has a short growing season, from August to November.
