= Asclepias buchwaldii =

Scientific classification
- Kingdom: Plantae
- Clade: Embryophytes
- Clade: Tracheophytes
- Clade: Spermatophytes
- Clade: Angiosperms
- Clade: Eudicots
- Clade: Asterids
- Order: Gentianales
- Family: Apocynaceae
- Genus: Asclepias
- Species: A. buchwaldii

Binomial name
- Asclepias buchwaldii De Wild.

Synonyms
- Asclepias affinis; Gomphocarpus buchwaldii; Trachycalymma buchwaldii

Species of plant

Asclepias buchwaldii is a species of perennial milkweed that is endemic to Tanzania, Malawi, Burundi, Zambia, Eswatini and the Democratic of the Congo. It grows primarily in the seasonally dry tropical biome. It is in the family Apocynaceae.
