= Asclepias mexicana =

Scientific classification
- Kingdom: Plantae
- Clade: Tracheophytes
- Clade: Angiosperms
- Clade: Eudicots
- Clade: Asterids
- Order: Gentianales
- Family: Apocynaceae
- Genus: Asclepias
- Species: A. mexicana

Binomial name
- Asclepias mexicana Cav.

Species of flowering plant

Asclepias mexicana grows in the western United States and Mexico. It has been found in the U.S. in California, Washington, Oregon, Idaho, and Arizona. A. mexicana Cav. can be distinguished by its whorled leaves, arranged in threes on the main stem and flowering branches and are rarely opposite.
