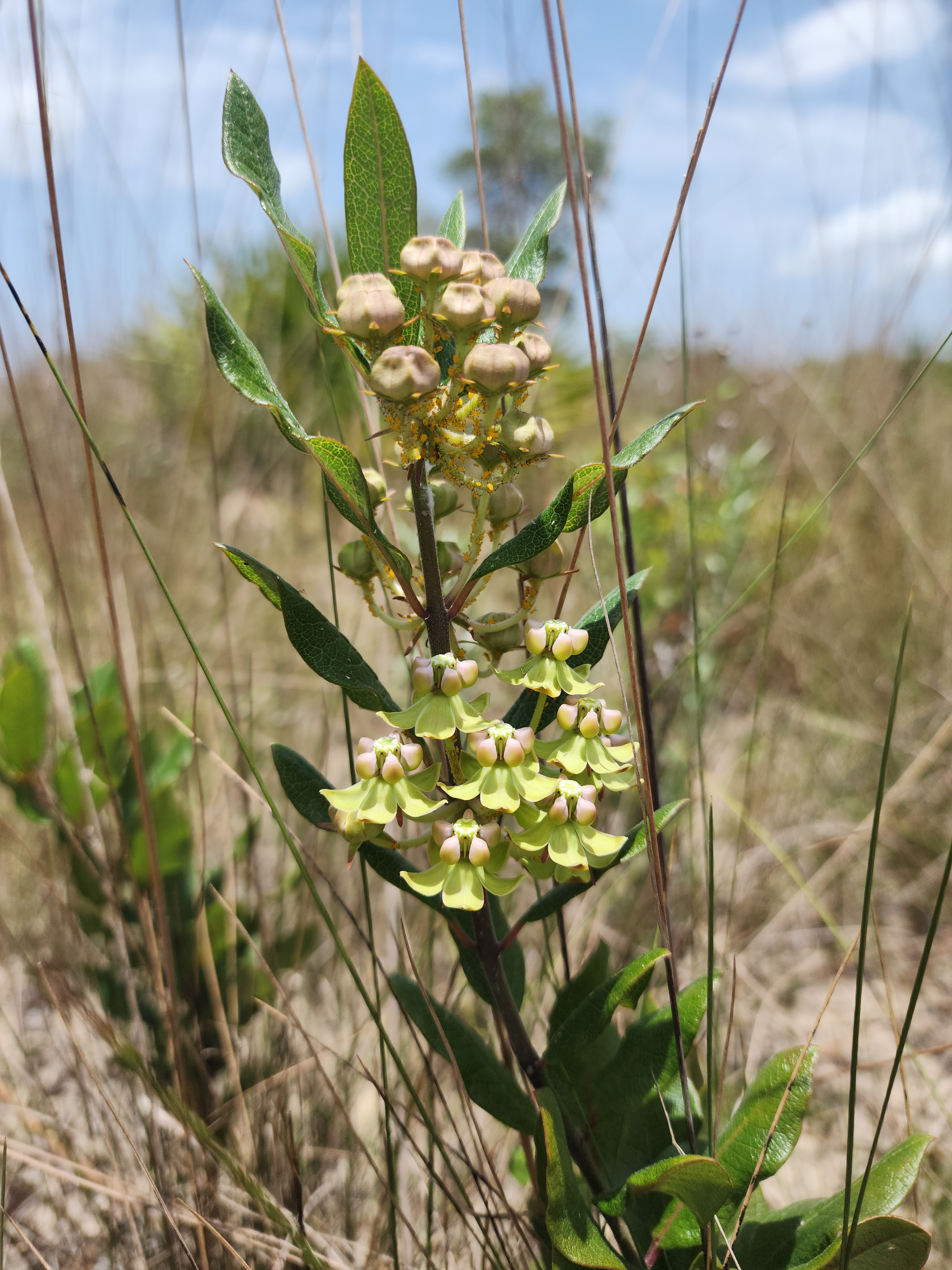
- Blooming in upper terrace Lake Wales Ridge sandhill habitat at Bok Tower Gardens

Conservation status
- Apparently Secure (NatureServe)

Scientific classification
- Kingdom: Plantae
- Clade: Embryophytes
- Clade: Tracheophytes
- Clade: Angiosperms
- Clade: Eudicots
- Clade: Asterids
- Order: Gentianales
- Family: Apocynaceae
- Genus: Asclepias
- Species: A. tomentosa

Binomial name
- Asclepias tomentosa Elliott

= Asclepias tomentosa =

Species of plant

Asclepias tomentosa (common names include velvet milkweed, velvetleaf milkweed, and tuba milkweed) is a flowering plant in the milkweed family. It is indigenous to parts of Florida, Texas, and some southeastern states in the United States. It is a perennial dicot.

Asclepias tormentosa grows in scrub, sandhill, xeric hammock edges, and scrubby flatwoods habitats. It provides nectar that feeds various species and is a larval host plant for monach (Danaus plexippus) , queen (Danaus gilippus) and soldier (Danaus eresimus) butterflies.

== Gallery ==
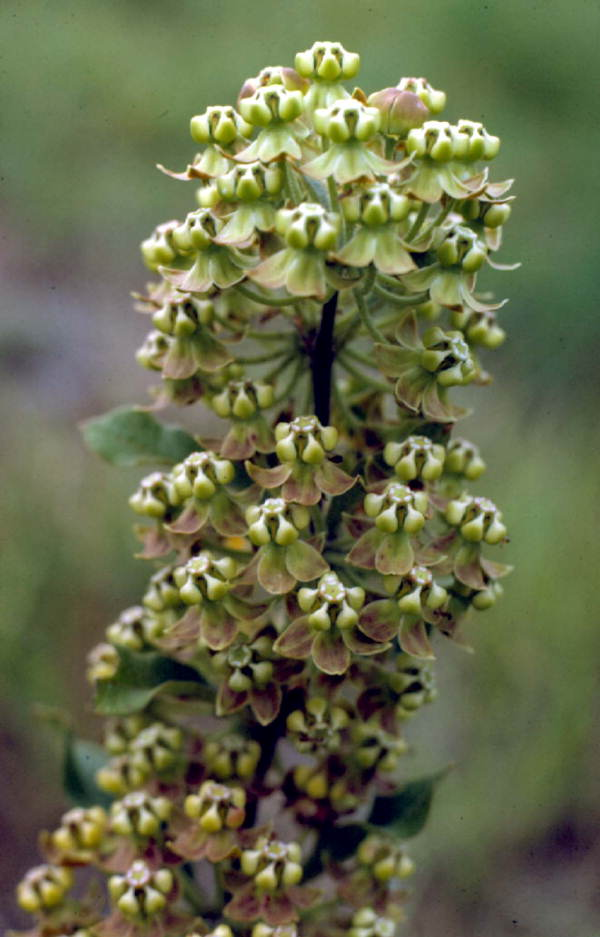
