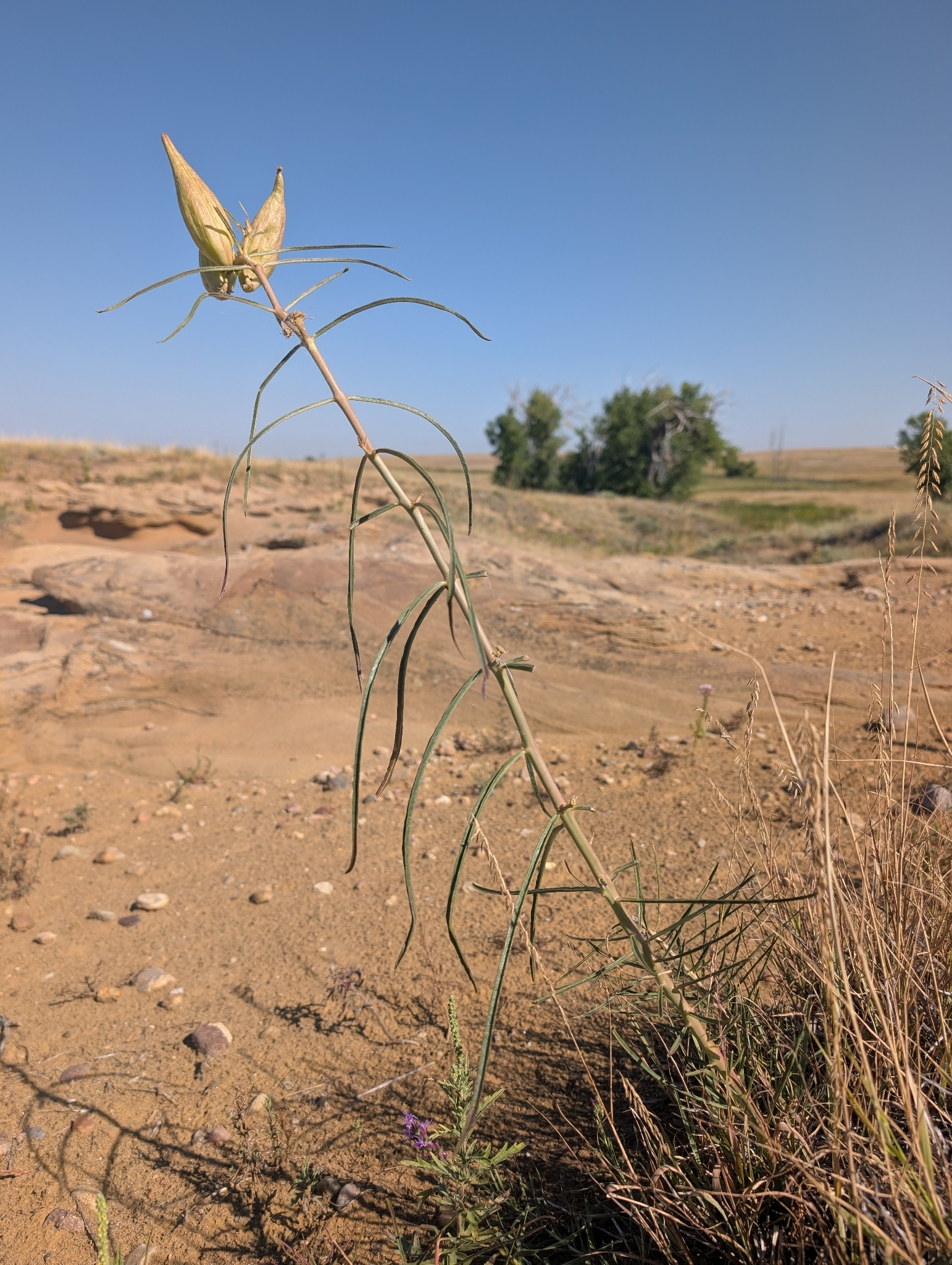
- Plains Conservation Center, Arapahoe County, Colorado

Conservation status
- Secure (NatureServe)

Scientific classification
- Kingdom: Plantae
- Clade: Embryophytes
- Clade: Tracheophytes
- Clade: Spermatophytes
- Clade: Angiosperms
- Clade: Eudicots
- Clade: Asterids
- Order: Gentianales
- Family: Apocynaceae
- Genus: Asclepias
- Species: A. engelmanniana

Binomial name
- Asclepias engelmanniana Woodson

Synonyms
- Acerates auriculata Engelm. ex Torr.; Acerates auriculata Lindh. & G.M.Ross; Asclepias auriculata (Engelm. ex Torr.) Holz.; Gomphocarpus auriculatus (Engelm. ex Torr.) K.Schum.

= Asclepias engelmanniana =

Plant species in the milkweed family

Asclepias engelmanniana, Engelmann's milkweed, is a species of milkweed from the central United States and northern Mexico.

== Description ==
Engelmann's milkweed is a perennial plant that usually has a single, tall stem, but can have two or even more on rare occasions. They typically grow to a height of 0.4 to 1.6 meters (1.3–5.2 ft) and usually do not have any branches.

The leaves mostly attach alternately or are subopposite, nearly opposite but slightly offset. They are linner, narrow and grasslike, growing to 5–19 centimeters (2–7.5 in) long, but just 1.5–3 millimeters wide.

== Taxonomy ==
Asclepias engelmanniana was scientifically described by John Torrey in 1859, but with the name Acerates auriculata and attributed to George Engelmann. This name also conflicted with an earlier description of Acerates auriculata by Ferdinand Lindheimer and George M. von Ross from 1853. The genus Acerates was later considered to be a synonym of Asclepias. When moved to Asclepias in 1892 by John Michael Holzinger, it conflicted with a prior use of the name by Carl Sigismund Kunth. The replacement name Asclepias engelmanniana was created by Robert Everard Woodson for the species in 1941. Along with its genus it is classified in the Apocynaceae family and it has four synonyms.

=== Names ===
The common name used for Asclepias engelmanniana is Engelmann's milkweed.

== Range and habitat ==
Engelmann's milkweed is native to northern Mexico and the central United States. In Mexico it grows in two states, Chihuahua and Coahuila. In New Mexico it grows in the eastern part of the state with reports from the west likely to be the similar Asclepias rusbyi. In Texas it is found in many scattered areas of the west and north and into western Oklahoma. It native primarily to western Kansas and is also found in eastern Colorado, but reports from southwestern Colorado are also Asclepias rusbyi. It is also found in seven widely scattered counties in Nebraska. The elevation range for the species is from 200 to 2,300 meters (660–7,550 ft).

The species prefers calcareous soils that are rocky or sandy and grows on prairies and stream bottoms.
