= Asclepias bifida =

Scientific classification
- Kingdom: Plantae
- Clade: Tracheophytes
- Clade: Angiosperms
- Clade: Eudicots
- Clade: Asterids
- Order: Gentianales
- Family: Apocynaceae
- Genus: Asclepias
- Species: A. bifida

Binomial name
- Asclepias bifida W.H.Blackw (1964)

Species of flowering plant

Asclepias bifida is a species of perennial milkweed endemic to Nuevo León, Mexico. It grows in the desert or dry shrubland biome. It is in the family Apocynaceae.
