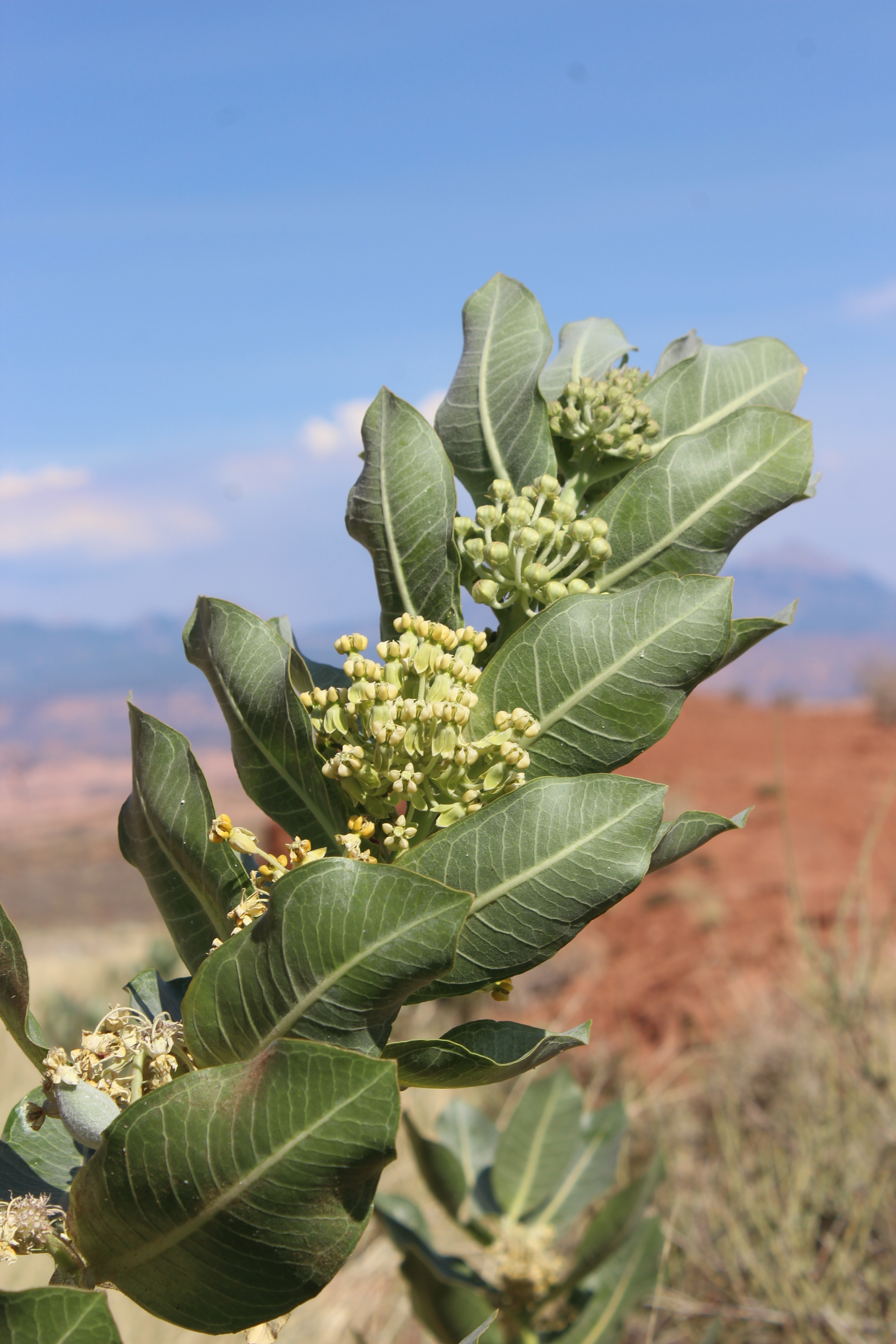

Scientific classification
- Kingdom: Plantae
- Clade: Tracheophytes
- Clade: Angiosperms
- Clade: Eudicots
- Clade: Asterids
- Order: Gentianales
- Family: Apocynaceae
- Genus: Asclepias
- Species: A. latifolia

Binomial name
- Asclepias latifolia (Torr.) Raf.

= Asclepias latifolia =

Species of flowering plant

Asclepias latifolia is a species of milkweed, also known by the common name broadleaf milkweed.

Its native range includes the American southwest ranging from California and southeastern Utah to Texas and Nebraska. It grows in disturbed areas, pinyon–juniper woodlands, mixed desert scrub and hanging rock gardens. It can be found growing in Arches National Park.

It is a perennial herb that grows up to 3 ft (0.91 m) tall. Leaves have attach directly to the stem, are 3–4 in (76–102 mm) long, and are relatively broad (the specific name latifolia means "broad-leaf"). Leaves have prominent veins and pubescence that lessens with age. It grows clusters of white to pale-green flowers 0.5–0.75 in (13–19 mm) long, which bloom April to July.

Asclepias latifolia is poisonous to some livestock. It exudes a milky latex.

== Gallery ==
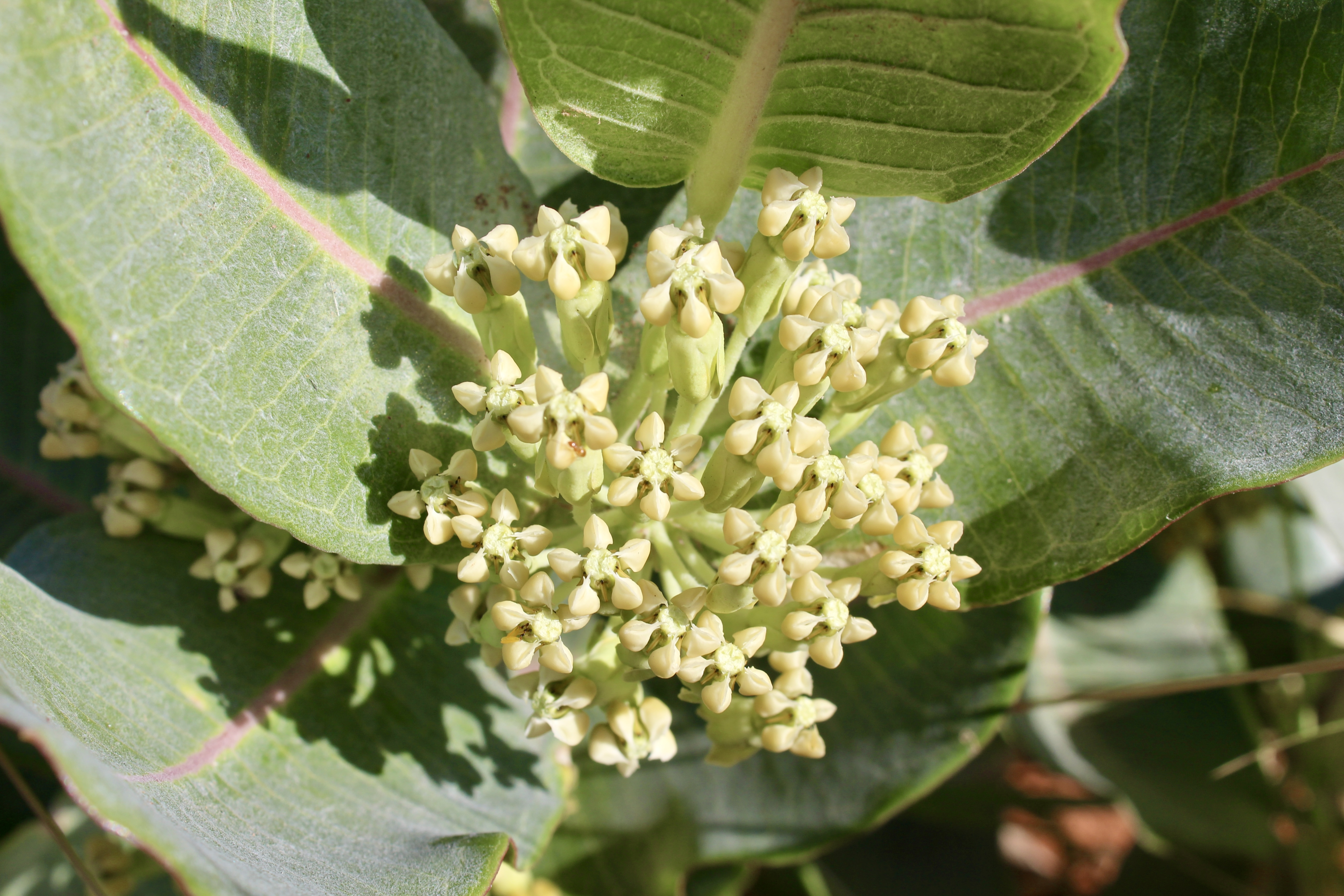
Flower cluster
