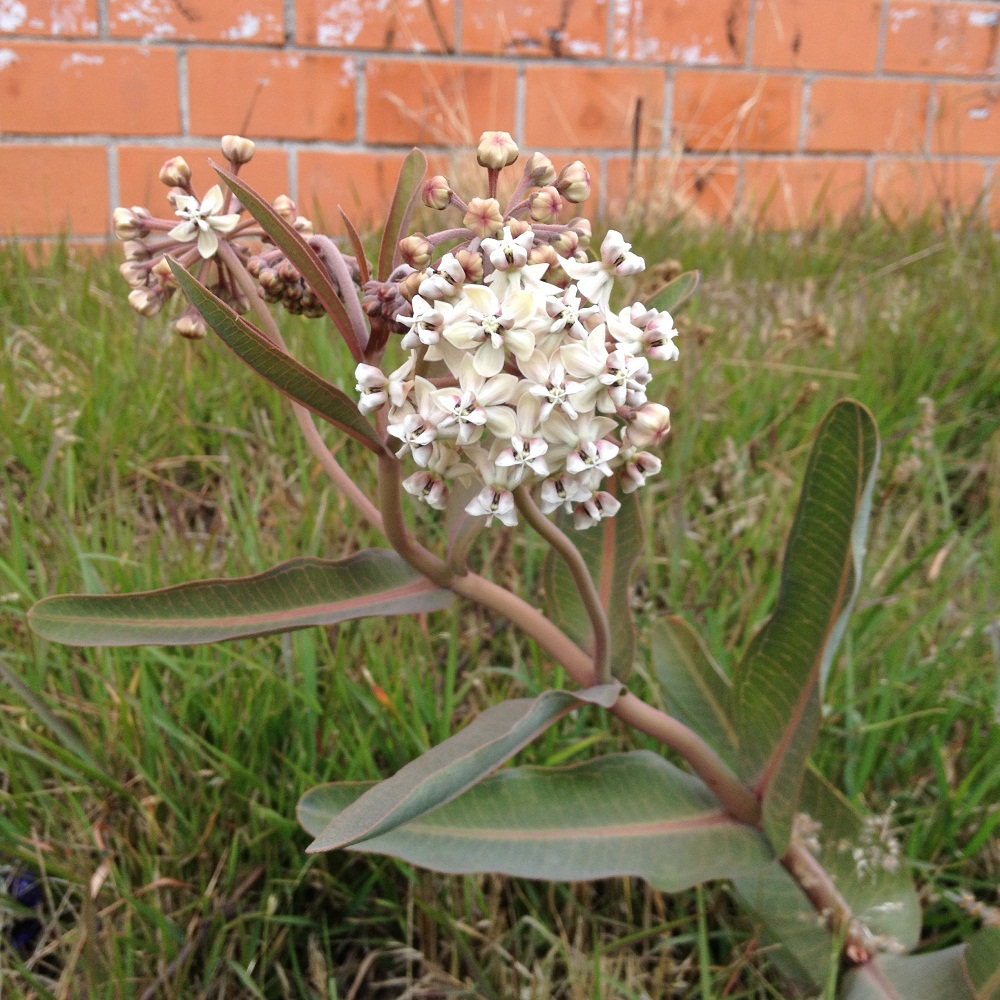

Conservation status
- Secure (NatureServe)

Scientific classification
- Kingdom: Plantae
- Clade: Tracheophytes
- Clade: Angiosperms
- Clade: Eudicots
- Clade: Asterids
- Order: Gentianales
- Family: Apocynaceae
- Genus: Asclepias
- Species: A. glaucescens

Binomial name
- Asclepias glaucescens Kunth

Synonyms
- Asclepias glaberrima Sessé & Moc.; Asclepias plumieriifolia Ram.Goyena; Asclepias polyphylla Brandegee; Asclepias sullivantii Torr.

= Asclepias glaucescens =

Species of flowering plant

Asclepias glaucescens, common name nodding milkweed, is a species of flowering plant in the milkweed (Asclepias) genus and Apocynaceae family. A perennial, it grows in Mexico and Central America. It is a host plant for monarch and queen butterflies.

It was described in 1819 and named by German botanist Carl Sigismund Kunth. "Glaucescens" is a Latin word for the color white.

== See also ==
- List of Asclepias species
