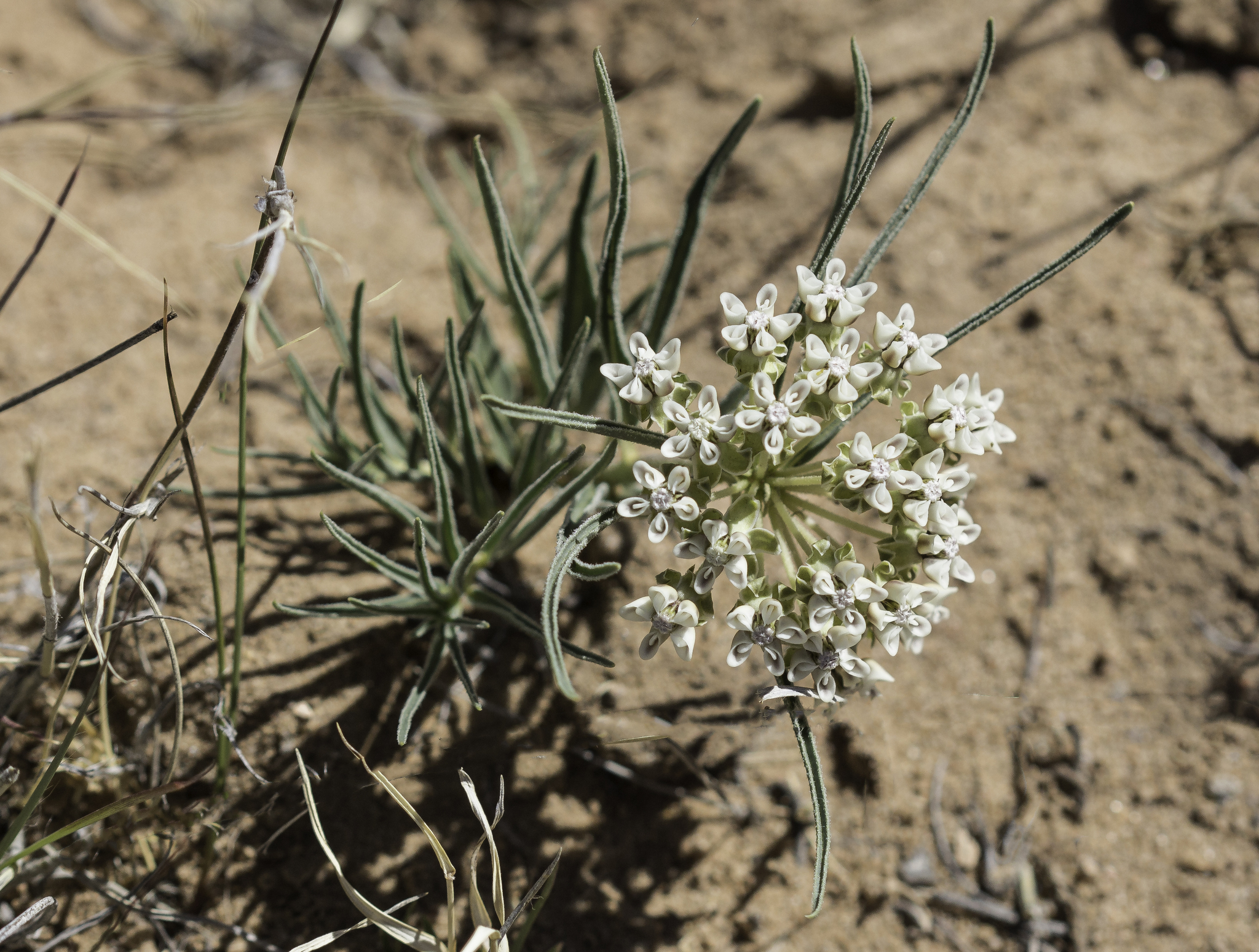
- Asclepias involucrata blooming in Sandoval County, New Mexico

Conservation status
- Secure (NatureServe)

Scientific classification
- Kingdom: Plantae
- Clade: Tracheophytes
- Clade: Angiosperms
- Clade: Eudicots
- Clade: Asterids
- Order: Gentianales
- Family: Apocynaceae
- Genus: Asclepias
- Species: A. involucrata

Binomial name
- Asclepias involucrata Engelm. ex Torr.

Synonyms
- Asclepias involucrata var. tomentosa Eastw.; Asclepias macrosperma Eastw.

= Asclepias involucrata =

Species of plant

Asclepias involucrata, synonym Asclepias macrosperma, (dwarf milkweed) is a perennial plant in the family Apocynaceae native from the west and south central United States to north Mexico. In the southwestern United States, it is found in the Colorado Plateau and Canyonlands region.

== Description ==
It is a perennial plant 2 to 10 inches (5.1 to 25.4 cm) long with stems lying on the ground. The leaves and stems are densely covered with hair. It blooms from April to June. The flowers are in clusters at the ends of stems, with five greenish-white downward bent petals and five greenish-white pouch-like sacs. The seedpods are shaped like spindles.

== Distribution and habitat ==
Asclepias involucrata is native to Arizona, Colorado, Kansas, New Mexico, Oklahoma, Texas, and Utah in the United States and to Northeast and Northwest Mexico. It can be found in mixed desert shrub and pinyon juniper woodland communities.

== Uses ==
The Zuni people mix the dry powdered root with saliva and use it for an unspecified illness. The Zuni also note that this plant is favored by jackrabbits.
