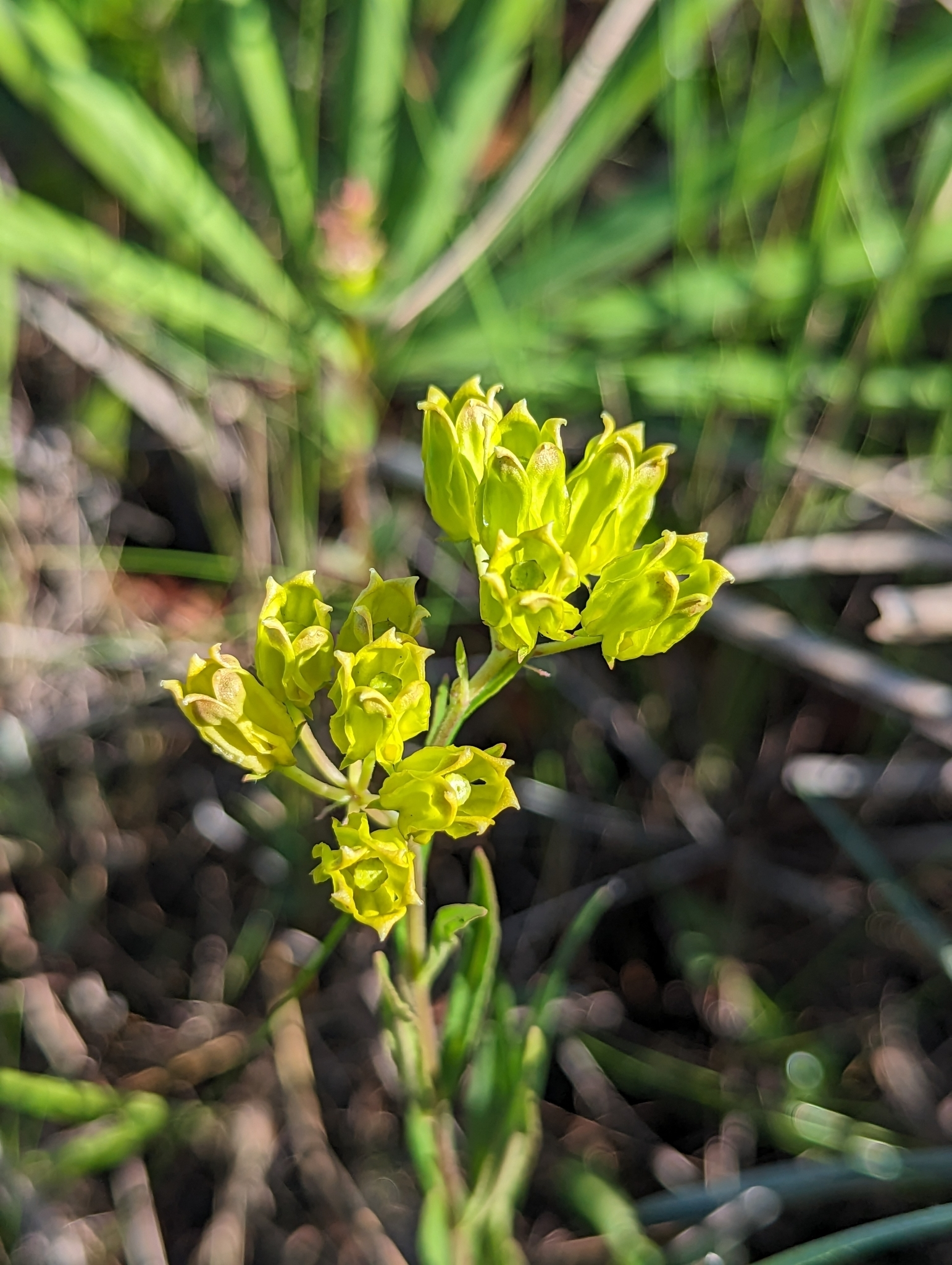

Conservation status
- Apparently Secure (NatureServe)

Scientific classification
- Kingdom: Plantae
- Clade: Tracheophytes
- Clade: Angiosperms
- Clade: Eudicots
- Clade: Asterids
- Order: Gentianales
- Family: Apocynaceae
- Genus: Asclepias
- Species: A. pedicellata

Binomial name
- Asclepias pedicellata Walter

= Asclepias pedicellata =

Species of plant

Asclepias pedicellata is a species of milkweed in the family Apocynaceae. It is a perennial herbaceous plant that produces yellow or green flowers. Its common name is savannah milkweed.

The species belongs to the genus Asclepias, a diverse group of flowering plants commonly known as milkweeds. Like other members of the genus, Asclepias pedicellata is a nectar-producing plant that can provide resources for pollinators. Milkweeds are also well known as host plants for the monarch butterfly and other lepidopteran species.

Asclepias pedicellata is a perennial species, meaning that it survives for more than two years and can regenerate during successive growing seasons. Its flowers are an important characteristic used in the identification of the species.
