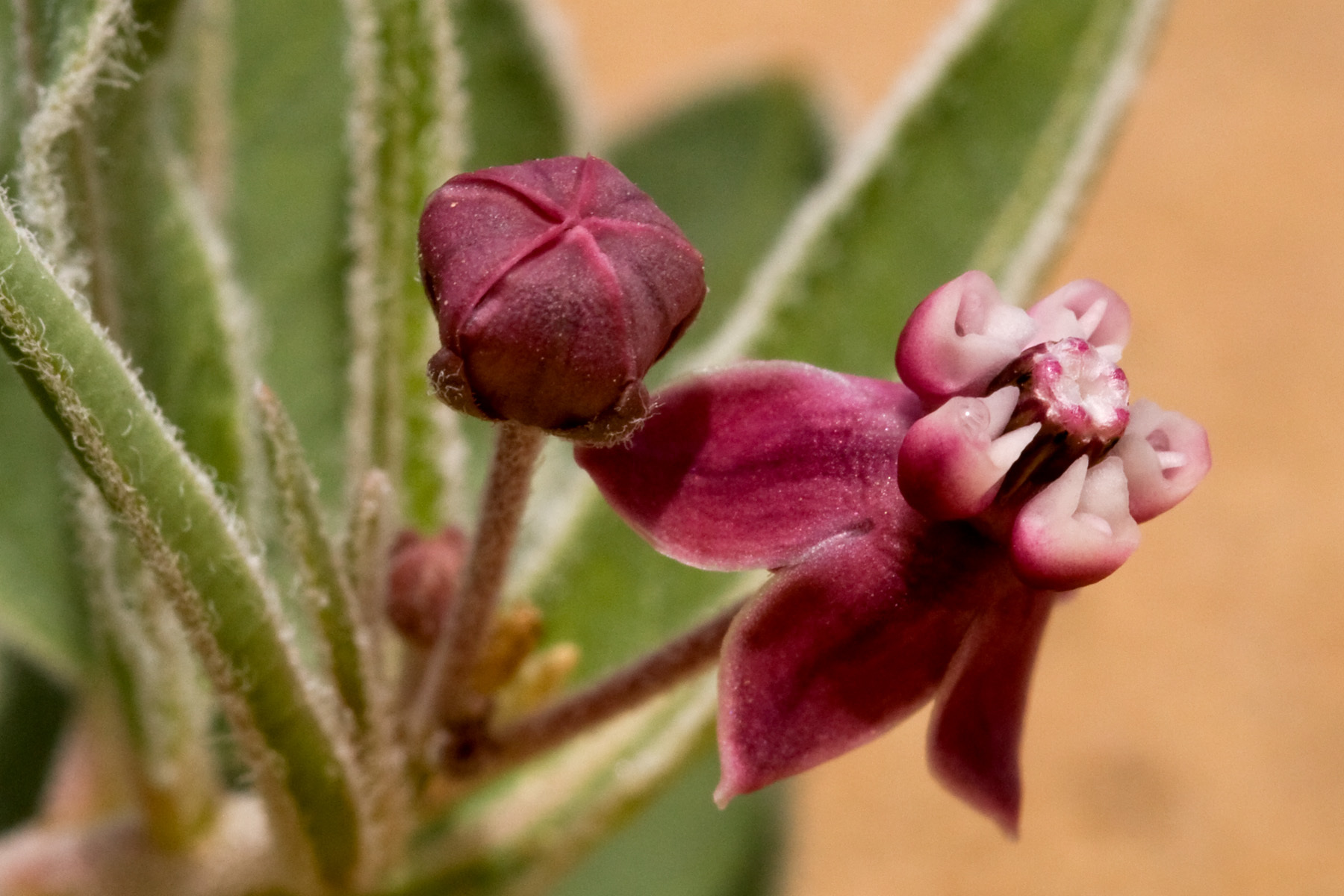

Scientific classification
- Kingdom: Plantae
- Clade: Tracheophytes
- Clade: Angiosperms
- Clade: Eudicots
- Clade: Asterids
- Order: Gentianales
- Family: Apocynaceae
- Genus: Asclepias
- Species: A. sanjuanensis

Binomial name
- Asclepias sanjuanensis Heil, Porter & Welsh

= Asclepias sanjuanensis =

San Juan Milkweed

Asclepias sanjuanensis, the San Juan milkweed, is a species of milkweed native to northwestern New Mexico. This species is restricted to the Four Corners area and is only present in San Juan County in New Mexico.

== Distribution ==
Asclepias sanjuanensis is endemic to the Four Corners Region in San Juan County, NM. Habitat comprises mostly in sandy or sandy loam soils in pinyon-juniper woodlands and Great Basin grassland communities. Known populations occur from 5,000 to 6,200 ft. elevation. Often in disturbed sites.
