= Asclepias constricta =

Scientific classification
- Kingdom: Plantae
- Clade: Embryophytes
- Clade: Tracheophytes
- Clade: Angiosperms
- Clade: Eudicots
- Clade: Asterids
- Order: Gentianales
- Family: Apocynaceae
- Genus: Asclepias
- Species: A. constricta

Binomial name
- Asclepias constricta M.E.Jones 1908

Species of flowering plant

Asclepias constricta is a species of perennial milkweed that is endemic to southwest Mexico. It grows primarily in the seasonally dry tropical biome.
