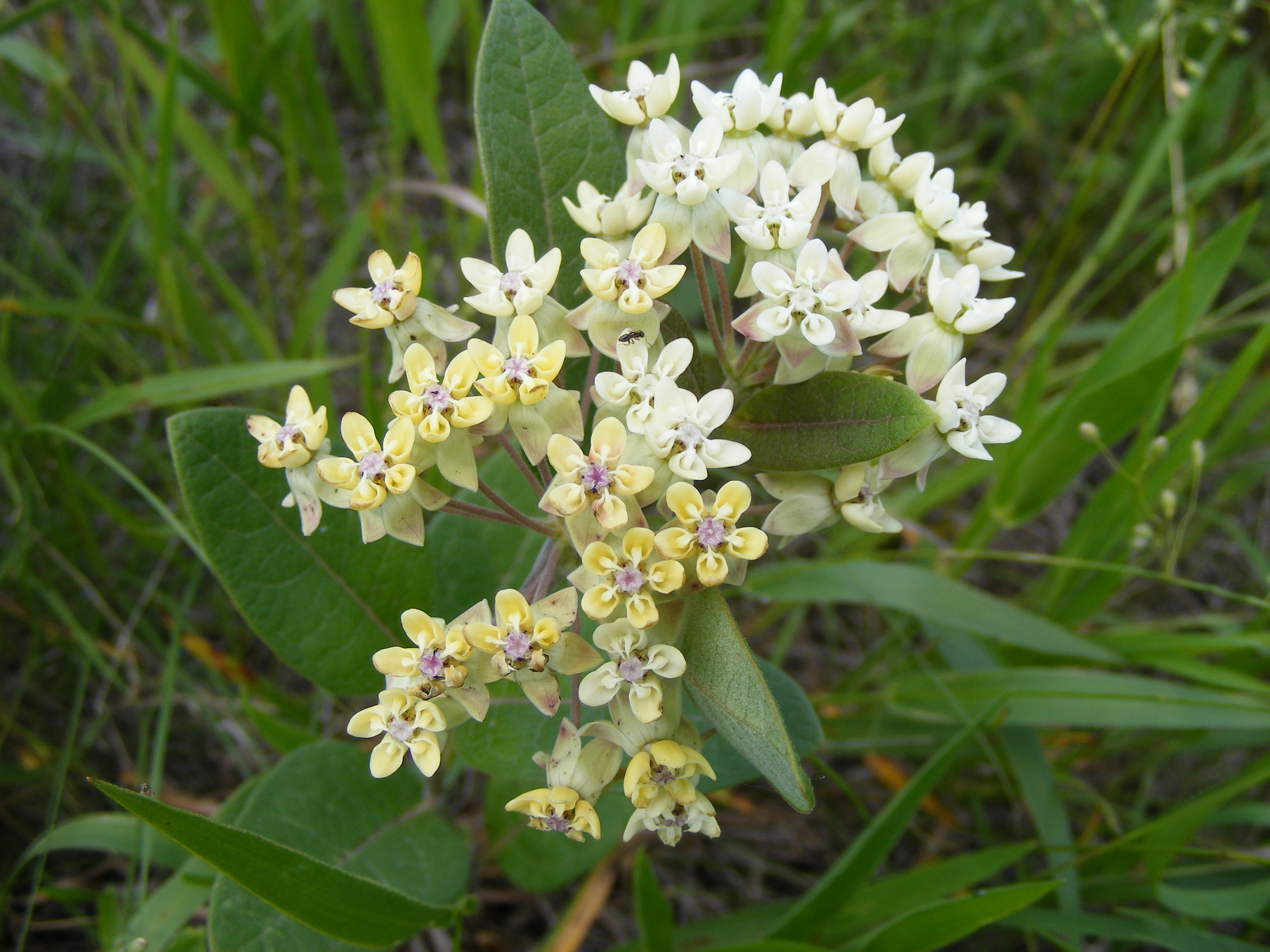

Conservation status
- Secure (NatureServe)

Scientific classification
- Kingdom: Plantae
- Clade: Embryophytes
- Clade: Tracheophytes
- Clade: Angiosperms
- Clade: Eudicots
- Clade: Asterids
- Order: Gentianales
- Family: Apocynaceae
- Genus: Asclepias
- Species: A. ovalifolia

Binomial name
- Asclepias ovalifolia Decne.

= Asclepias ovalifolia =

Species of plant

Asclepias ovalifolia, commonly called oval-leaved milkweed or dwarf milkweed, is a species of flowering plant in the milkweed genus and dogbane family (Apocynaceae). It is native to South Central Canada and the Northern Midwest of the United States.

== Description ==
It is a monoecious perennial plant that is shorter than most other milkweeds, reaching 30–70 cm (12–28 inches) in total height. Pairs of ovoid leaves grow directly from the stem and give the plant its common name. Its white flowers bloom from late May through early July. Follicles develop from fertilized flowers between July and September and contain many long haired seeds. Like most milkweeds, this species produces a milky sap in its tissues. The sap is toxic, containing cardiac glycosides, but some species have adapted to eat the plant without harm, notably the monarch butterfly.

== Distribution and habitat ==
Ovalleaf milkweed is the northernmost-ranging species in the genus Asclepias. The core of its range is Minnesota, North Dakota, Manitoba, and Saskatchewan. It is also found in Illinois, Iowa, Michigan, Montana, South Dakota, Wyoming, and Ontario.

The plants preferred habitat is dry upland prairie, oak savanna, and pine barrens. Wildfire in natural environments or overstory thinning in managed ones is preferred by the species as its shorter stature means it can be crowded out by taller prairie plants.
