= Asclepias atroviolacea =

Scientific classification
- Kingdom: Plantae
- Clade: Tracheophytes
- Clade: Angiosperms
- Clade: Eudicots
- Clade: Asterids
- Order: Gentianales
- Family: Apocynaceae
- Genus: Asclepias
- Species: A. atroviolacea

Binomial name
- Asclepias atroviolacea Woodson (1954)

Species of flowering plant

Asclepias atroviolacea is a species of perennial milkweed endemic to northern Mexico. It grows in the desert or dry shrubland biome. It is in the family Apocynaceae.
