= Asclepias aurea =

Scientific classification
- Kingdom: Plantae
- Clade: Tracheophytes
- Clade: Angiosperms
- Clade: Eudicots
- Clade: Asterids
- Order: Gentianales
- Family: Apocynaceae
- Genus: Asclepias
- Species: A. aurea

Binomial name
- Asclepias aurea (Schltr.) Schltr.

Synonyms
- Gomphocarpus aureus; Aidomene parvula; Asclepias radiata; Gomphocarpus schizoglossoides; Schizoglossum pedunculatum; Asclepias baumii

Species of flowering plant

Golden Star-Drops (Asclepias aurea).

Asclepias aurea, or golden star drops, is a species of perennial milkweed endemic to the Democratic Republic of the Congo, Angola, Eswatini, KwaZulu-Natal, Lesotho, Namibia, Zambia, and South Africa. It grows in grasslands and periodically burned montane. It blooms September to February.
