= Asclepias emoryi =

Scientific classification
- Kingdom: Plantae
- Clade: Tracheophytes
- Clade: Angiosperms
- Clade: Eudicots
- Clade: Asterids
- Order: Gentianales
- Family: Apocynaceae
- Genus: Asclepias
- Species: A. emoryi

Binomial name
- Asclepias emoryi (Greene) Vail

Synonyms
- Podostemma emoryi Greene; Podostemma leoninum Greene

Species of flowering plant

Asclepias emoryi, common name Emory's milkweed, is a species of flowering plant in the milkweed (Asclepias) genus and Apocynaceae family. It grows in New Mexico, Texas, and Mexico. It is a perennial.

It was described by American botanist Edward Lee Greene in 1897. It grows in sandy soils including disturbed areas.

== See also ==
- List of Asclepias species
