= Asclepias breviantherae =

Scientific classification
- Kingdom: Plantae
- Clade: Embryophytes
- Clade: Tracheophytes
- Clade: Spermatophytes
- Clade: Angiosperms
- Clade: Eudicots
- Clade: Asterids
- Order: Gentianales
- Family: Apocynaceae
- Genus: Asclepias
- Species: A. breviantherae

Binomial name
- Asclepias breviantherae Goyder 2012

Species of plant

Asclepias breviantherae is a species of perennial milkweed endemic to southwest Tanzania to northern Malawi. It has two subspecies, Asclepias breviantherae breviantherae and Asclepias breviantherae minor. It grows in the seasonally dry tropical biome. It is in the family Apocynaceae.
