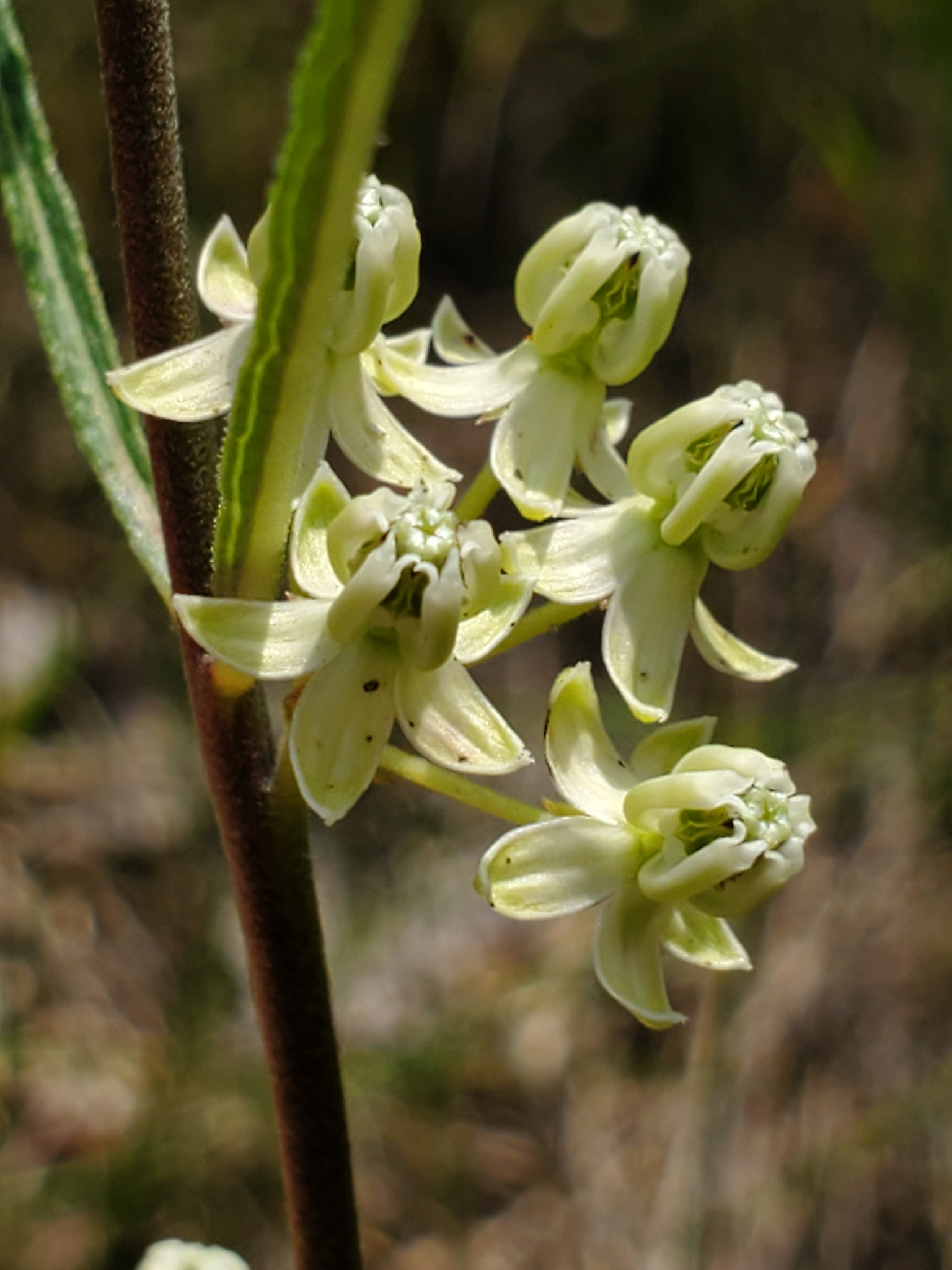
- Flowers

Conservation status
- Apparently Secure (NatureServe)

Scientific classification
- Kingdom: Plantae
- Clade: Tracheophytes
- Clade: Angiosperms
- Clade: Eudicots
- Clade: Asterids
- Order: Gentianales
- Family: Apocynaceae
- Genus: Asclepias
- Species: A. stenophylla

Binomial name
- Asclepias stenophylla A.Gray

Synonyms
- Acerates angustifolia Decne.; Polyotus angustifolius Nutt.

= Asclepias stenophylla =

Plant species in the dogbane family

Asclepias stenophylla is a species of flowering plant in the dogbane family commonly called slimleaf milkweed and narrow-leaved green milkweed.

== Description ==
Asclepias stenophylla is a herbaceous perennial, usually with one or two slender stems, but on rare occasions there can be more. They are slender and typically unbranched, reaching 30 to 80 centimeters (1–2.5 ft) tall, but that can occasionally be as much as 1 meter (3.3 ft) long. They grow from a thick carrot-like storage root that continues downward as a taproot; it reaches depths of 30 to 100 centimeters (1.0–3.3 ft). The stems are puberulent, covered in short, erect, narrow hairs, to just short of being hairless. As with all the prairie species of milkweed, except for butterfly weed (Asclepias tuberosa), it has milky sap.

The narrow leaves are attached to the stems alternately or short of being opposite, but can be attached oppositely. They are linear, resembling a grass blade, and are 5–16 centimeters (2.0–6.3 in) long while just 0.1–0.5 cm in width.

The pale greenish to yellow flowers are arranged into axillary umbels with 10 to 25 flowers per umbel. The umbels are subsessile or have very short peduncles. The flowers have very small horns which are attached to the hoods most of their length, with the short tip and terminal lobes being free. The fruits are upright, slender follicles 9 to 12 cm long. Flowering occurs in June through August.

== Taxonomy ==
Asclepias stenophylla is classified in the genus Asclepias as part of the Apocynaceae family. It was scientifically described and named in 1877 by Asa Gray. It has no accepted subspecies and has one homotypic synonym, Polyotus angustifolius, published in 1835 by Thomas Nuttall and one heterotypic synonym, Acerates angustifolia, published in 1844 by Joseph Decaisne.

=== Names ===
The species name, stenophylla, is a Botanical Latin compound word from Greek στενός (stenos) meaning "narrow" and φύλλον (phullon) meaning "leaf". Asclepias stenophylla is known by the common names slimleaf milkweed, narrow-leaved milkweed, narrowleaf milkweed, narrow-leaved green milkweed, and bilobe milkweed.

== Habitat ==
Slimleaf milkweed grows on dry prairies and in forest openings. It will grow in a wide variety of soil types including rocky, sand, and clay as well as different rock types such as limestone, dolomite, and rhyolite. In Minnesota it has been found growing in gravelly soils at the foot of hill prairies on the south-west facing sides of the hills, which is similar to the typical habitat, including limestone glades, of the species in other states . It can be found at elevations as low as 70 meters (230 ft) to as high as 1,900 meters (6,200 ft).

== Distribution ==
Asclepias stenophylla grows naturally in south eastern Minnesota through the Great Plains, to south eastern Montana to northern Texas, east to South Dakota, Missouri, and Arkansas.

It is listed as endangered in some US states:

- In Illinois, where it is found on hill prairies in the western part of the state.
- In Minnesota, where the plants are believed to be the result of the natural expansion of this species range, it is 500 km from the species main range.
- In Iowa, where it is found in the most western part of the state, which is the north-eastern edge of the species natural current range.

In Montana it is listed as a species of concern.
