= Asclepias bracteolata =

Scientific classification
- Kingdom: Plantae
- Clade: Embryophytes
- Clade: Tracheophytes
- Clade: Spermatophytes
- Clade: Angiosperms
- Clade: Eudicots
- Clade: Asterids
- Order: Gentianales
- Family: Apocynaceae
- Genus: Asclepias
- Species: A. bracteolata

Binomial name
- Asclepias bracteolata E.Fourn. (1885)

Species of plant

Asclepias bracteolata is a species of perennial milkweed endemic to Brazil. It grows in the seasonally dry tropical biome.
