= Asclepias viridula =

Conservation status
- Imperiled (NatureServe)

Scientific classification
- Kingdom: Plantae
- Clade: Embryophytes
- Clade: Tracheophytes
- Clade: Spermatophytes
- Clade: Angiosperms
- Clade: Eudicots
- Clade: Asterids
- Order: Gentianales
- Family: Apocynaceae
- Genus: Asclepias
- Species: A. viridula

Binomial name
- Asclepias viridula Chapm.

Species of plant

Asclepias viridula, commonly known as southern milkweed, is a species of milkweed (Asclepias) genus in the Apocynaceae family. It is a perennial found in Florida, Georgia, and Alabama. It grows in the Florida panhandle. Its flowers are white or green.
