= Asclepias bartlettiana =

Scientific classification
- Kingdom: Plantae
- Clade: Tracheophytes
- Clade: Angiosperms
- Clade: Eudicots
- Clade: Asterids
- Order: Gentianales
- Family: Apocynaceae
- Genus: Asclepias
- Species: A. bartlettiana

Binomial name
- Asclepias bartlettiana Woodson

Species of flowering plant

Asclepias bartlettiana is a species of perennial milkweed endemic to Tamaulipas, Mexico. It grows in the desert and shrubland biome. It tolerates drought and benefits from fire. It can resprout from deep taproots after fire or top damage. It grows up to 60cm high and has a high drought tolerance. It blooms May through August with fragrant, cream colored blossoms.

Asclepias bartlettiana is a nectar source for bees and butterflies. It is also a larval food plant for the Monarch butterfly . The plant can be propagated from seed with a germination time of 7 to 21 days. The seeds must be exposed to cold and moist weather for 30 to 60 days before sprouting.
