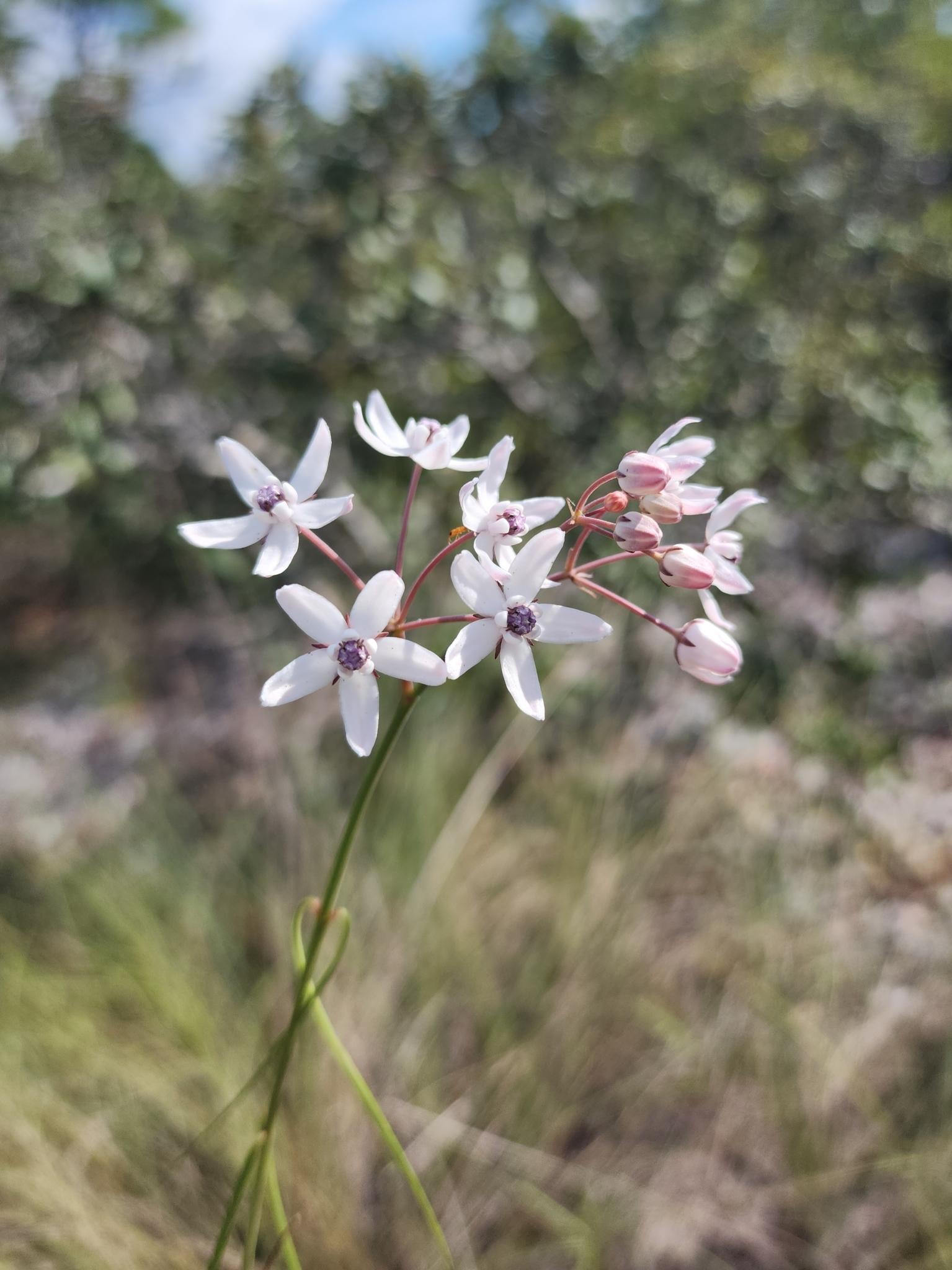

Conservation status
- Apparently Secure (NatureServe)

Scientific classification
- Kingdom: Plantae
- Clade: Tracheophytes
- Clade: Angiosperms
- Clade: Eudicots
- Clade: Asterids
- Order: Gentianales
- Family: Apocynaceae
- Genus: Asclepias
- Species: A. feayi

Binomial name
- Asclepias feayi Chapm. ex A. Gray

= Asclepias feayi =

Species of plant

Asclepias feayi is a species of milkweed endemic to Florida. Its common name is Florida milkweed. It is in the family Apocynaceae.
