= Asclepias connivens =

Conservation status
- Apparently Secure (NatureServe)

Scientific classification
- Kingdom: Plantae
- Clade: Embryophytes
- Clade: Tracheophytes
- Clade: Spermatophytes
- Clade: Angiosperms
- Clade: Eudicots
- Clade: Asterids
- Order: Gentianales
- Family: Apocynaceae
- Genus: Asclepias
- Species: A. connivens

Binomial name
- Asclepias connivens Baldwin

Species of plant

Asclepias connivens is a species of milkweed, commonly called Baldwin's milkweed or the largeflower milkweed. It is an obligate wetland species, native to the southeastern United States (Alabama, Georgia, Florida).

It was first identified in 1817 by American botanist, William Baldwin. The name connivens refers to the conniving (converging) hoods over the stigma. The plant produces 3/4 in (19 mm) greenish-yellow flowers, blooming between July and August and 5–7 in (130–180 mm) seed bearing follicles from mature fruit. The stalks of the plant grow up to 37 in (94 cm) in height. The leaves are 3.9–4.7 in (9.9–11.9 cm) long and 1.2–2.0 in (3.0–5.1 cm) wide and are opposite and sessile. The plant dies back to the ground in winter.
