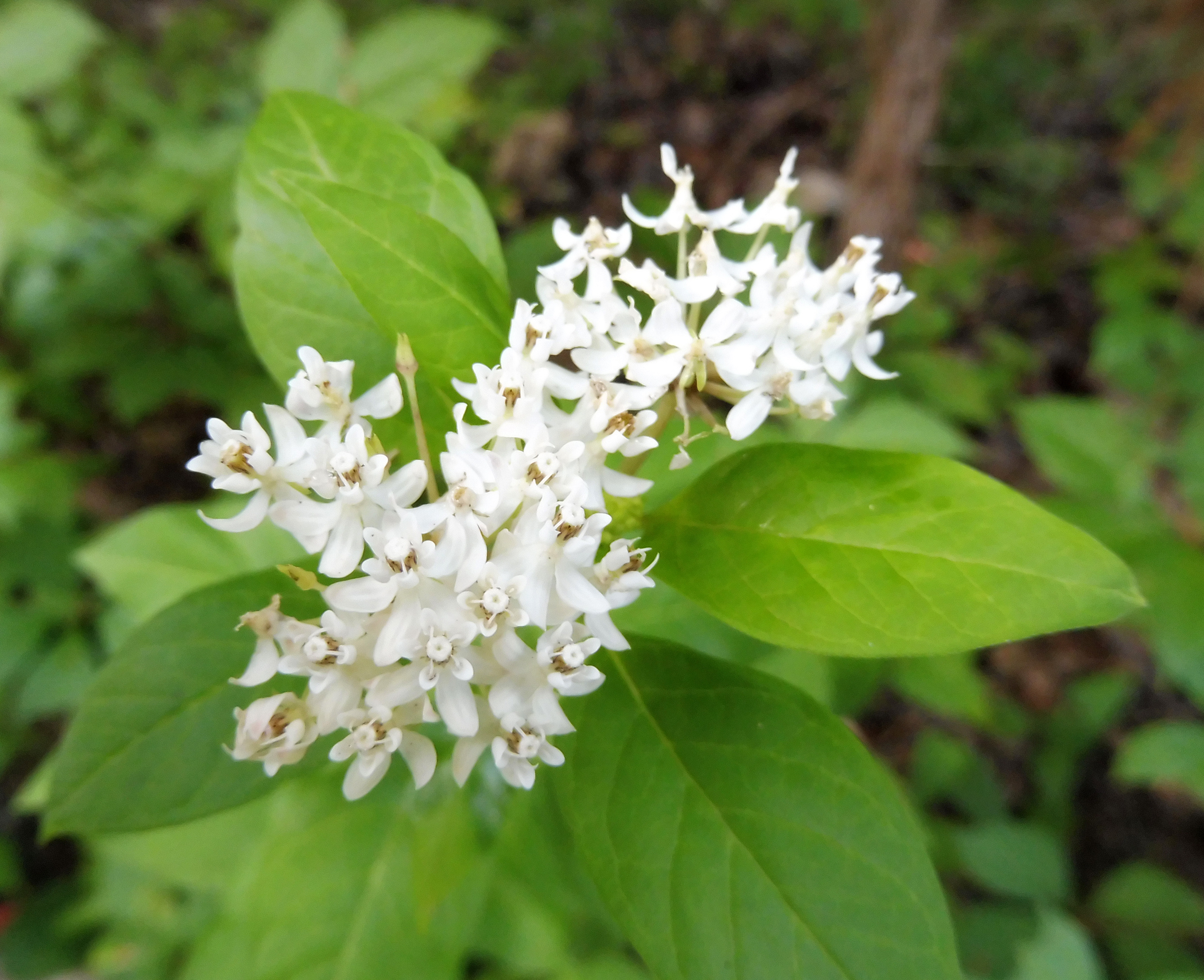

Scientific classification
- Kingdom: Plantae
- Clade: Tracheophytes
- Clade: Angiosperms
- Clade: Eudicots
- Clade: Asterids
- Order: Gentianales
- Family: Apocynaceae
- Genus: Asclepias
- Species: A. texana

Binomial name
- Asclepias texana A. Heller

= Asclepias texana =

Species of plant

Asclepias texana, commonly called Texas milkweed, is a species of flowering plant in the dogbane family (Apocynaceae). It is native to North America, where it is widespread in the regions of the Chihuahuan Desert and Edwards Plateau. Its range spans from the states of Durango and Coahuilla in Mexico, north to the state of Texas in the United States. Its natural habitat is in dry rocky areas in canyons or along arroyos.

Asclepias texana is a shrubby perennial, growing to about 2 feet (60 cm) tall. It produces bright white flowers in the summer.
