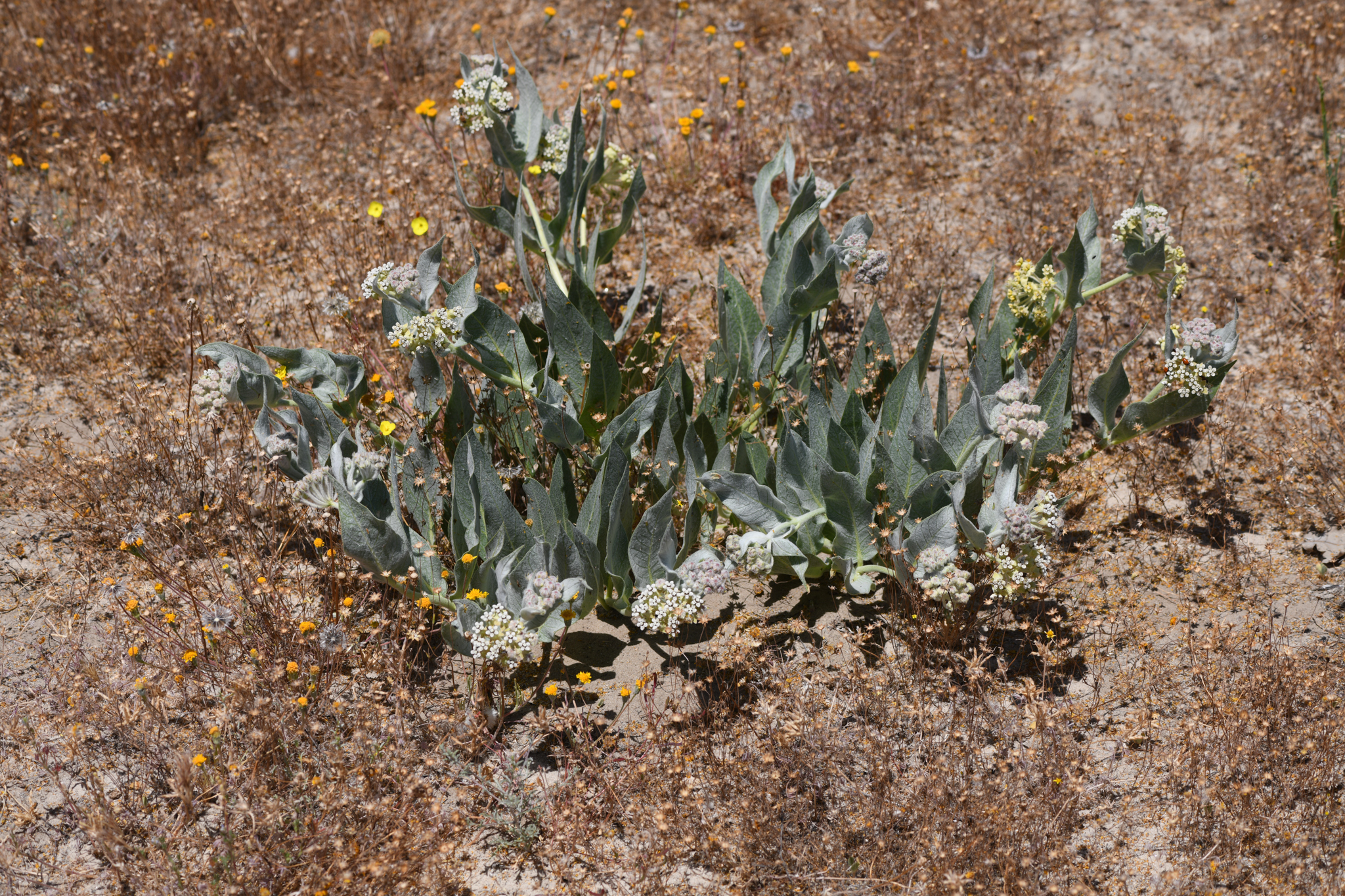

Scientific classification
- Kingdom: Plantae
- Clade: Tracheophytes
- Clade: Angiosperms
- Clade: Eudicots
- Clade: Asterids
- Order: Gentianales
- Family: Apocynaceae
- Genus: Asclepias
- Species: A. vestita

Binomial name
- Asclepias vestita Hook. & Arn.

= Asclepias vestita =

Species of plant

Asclepias vestita is a species of milkweed known by the common name woolly milkweed. It is endemic to California, where it grows in many habitats across the state, from mountains to desert to valley. This is a robust perennial herb growing mostly upright or slightly bending. The thick leaves are oval to narrowly lance-shaped. The stem and leaves often have a coat of light-colored hairs, sometimes thick and woolly. The inflorescence is an umbel-shaped array to a spherical cluster of yellowish flowers. The flowers may be tinted with brown or purple. The fruit is a large yellowish follicle containing many silky-haired seeds.
