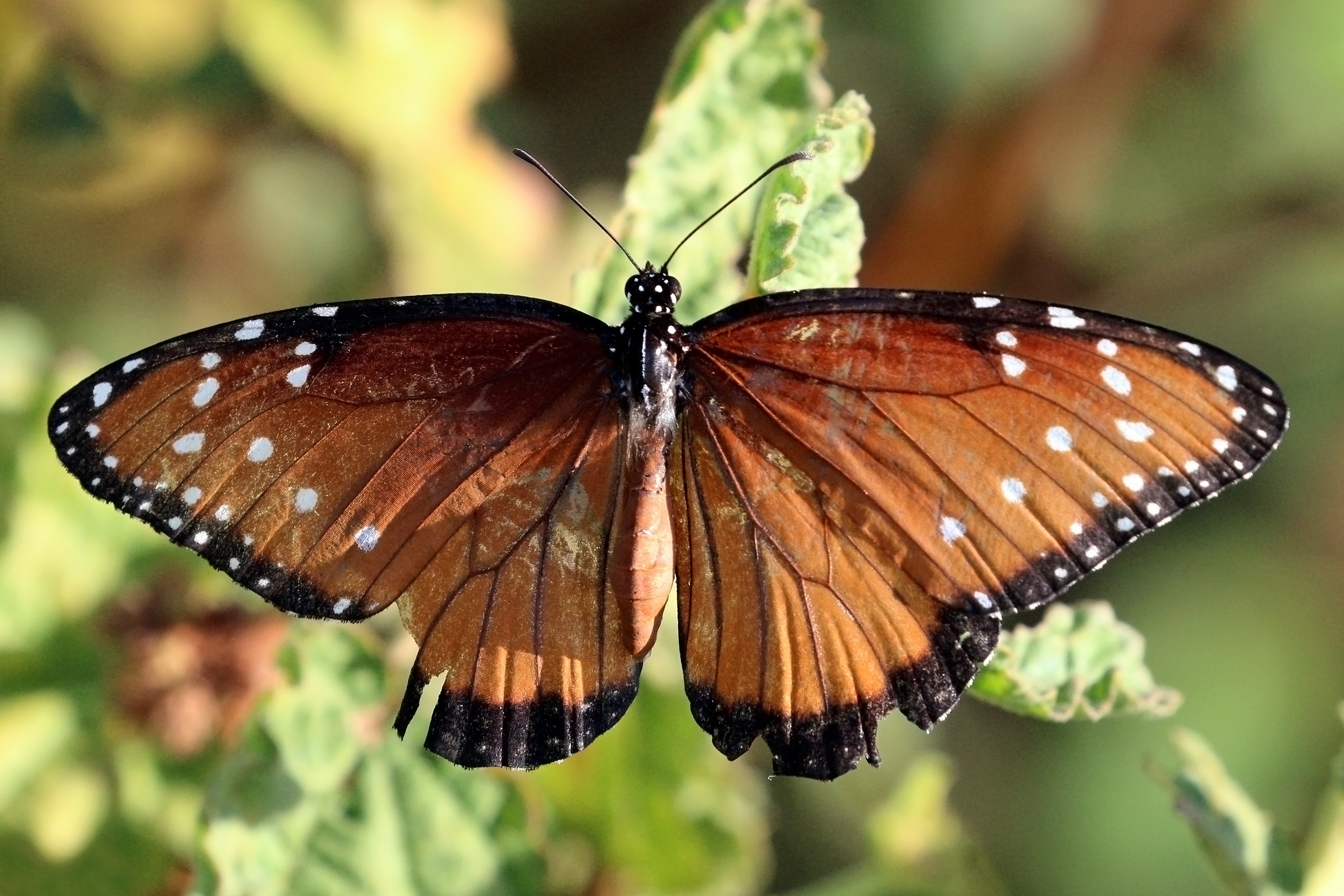
- Female
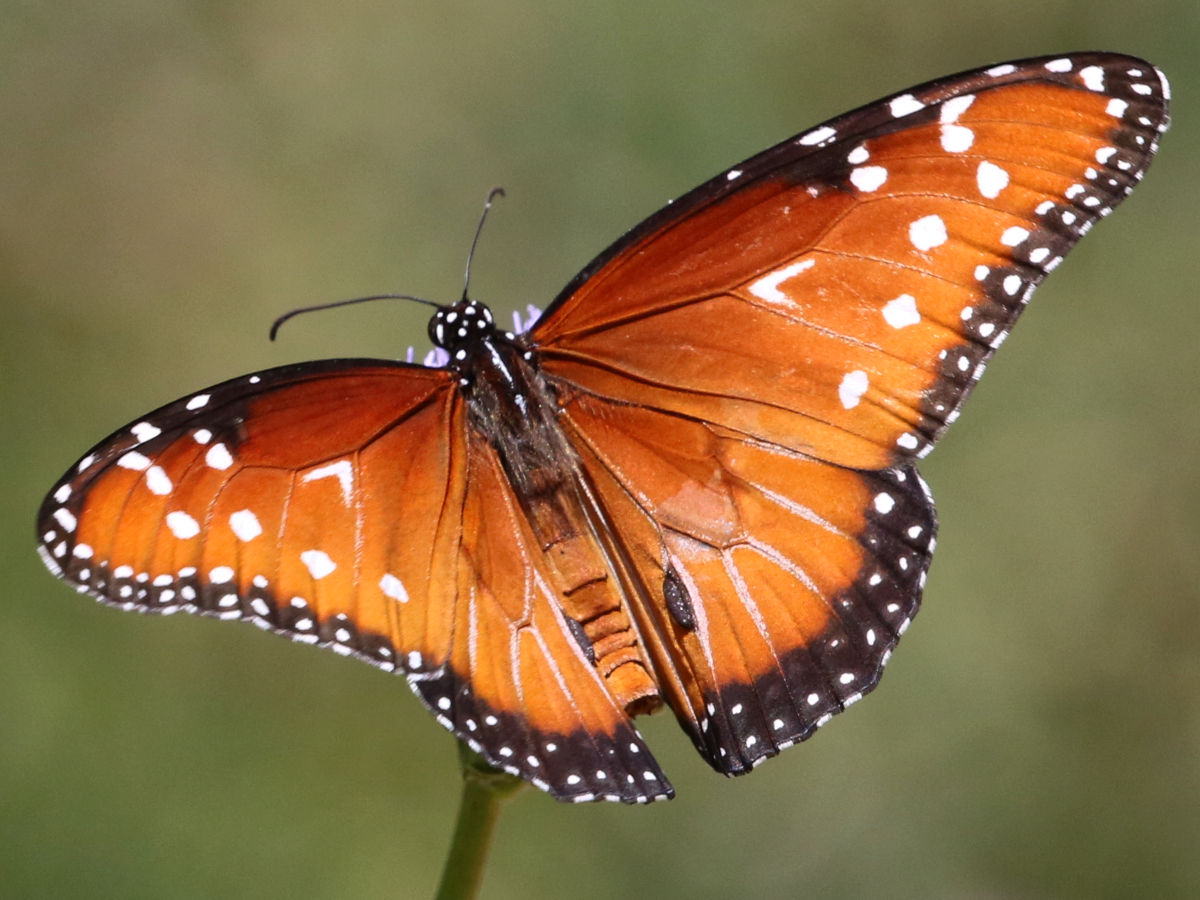
- Male

Conservation status
- Secure (NatureServe)

- Least Concern (IUCN 3.1)

Scientific classification
- Kingdom: Animalia
- Phylum: Arthropoda
- Clade: Pancrustacea
- Class: Insecta
- Order: Lepidoptera
- Family: Nymphalidae
- Genus: Danaus
- Species: D. gilippus

Binomial name
- Danaus gilippus (Cramer, [1775])

= Queen (butterfly) =

Species of butterfly

The queen butterfly (Danaus gilippus) is a North and South American butterfly in the family Nymphalidae with a wingspan of 80–85 mm (3 1/8–3 3/8 in). It is orange or brown with black wing borders and small white forewing spots on its dorsal wing surface, and reddish ventral wing surface fairly similar to the dorsal surface. The ventral hindwings have black veins and small white spots in a black border. The male has a black androconial scent patch on its dorsal hindwings. It can be found in meadows, fields, marshes, deserts, and at the edges of forests.

This species is possibly a close relative to the similarly colored soldier butterfly (or tropical queen, D. eresimus), in any case, it is not close to the plain tiger (D. chrysippus, African queen) as was long believed. There are seven subspecies.

Females lay one egg at a time on larval host plants. Larvae use these plants as a food source, whereas adult butterflies feed mainly on nectar from flowers. Unpalatability to avian predators is a feature of the butterfly; however, its level is highly variable. Unpalatability is correlated with the level of cardenolides obtained via the larval diet, but other compounds like alkaloids also play a part in promoting distastefulness.

Males patrol to search for females, who may mate up to 15 times a day. Male organs called hair-pencils play an important role in courtship, with males with lower hair-pencil counts being selected against. These hair-pencils may be involved in releasing pheromones during courtship that could attract female mates.

== Taxonomy ==
The queen is a member of the genus Danaus, which includes D. plexippus (monarch) and D. eresimus (soldier). It is of the family Nymphalidae of the order Lepidoptera. There are as many as eleven subspecies recognized. It is a native of the Nearctic and Neotropical realms. The conservation status of this species is secure, with no reported management needs.

== Life cycle and morphology ==
Females lay small white eggs one at a time on larval host plants, usually members of the milkweed subfamily Asclepiadoideae. The egg hatches into a black caterpillar with transverse white stripes and yellow spots, and three pairs of long, black filaments. The caterpillar feeds on the host plant and sequesters chemicals that make it distasteful to some predators. It then goes through five instars, after which the larva finds a suitable spot to pupate. The adult emerges 7 to 10 days afterwards. The queen butterfly has multiple generations per year.

=== Egg ===
The queen butterfly oviposits one egg at a time. Each individual egg can be found on leaves, stems, and flower buds of the host. The eggs are usually pale green, ovate to conical in shape, with a flattened base and slightly truncated top, and is longitudinally ribbed with raised cross-lines between the ridges. Compared to that of the monarch butterfly, the egg of the queen butterfly is taller relative to its width.

=== Caterpillar ===
The mature queen caterpillar is darker and not as brightly colored as the monarch caterpillar. It is nearly identical to the caterpillar of Danaus chrysippus.

In the larval stage, the queen is bluish-white dorsally, with a reddish-brown underside. It has three pairs of black, fleshy tentacles—one is on the head, one is on the second thoracic segment and one is on the eighth abdominal segment. When mature, the caterpillar is brown with purplish prolegs. It has been observed with the following color variants of its transverse stripes: blue, green, yellow, white, and blackish brown. The head is black with white rings. The caterpillar lacks spines, and there is no hair on its body.

=== Pupa ===
The pupa is relatively short and thick, tapering rapidly at the end of the abdomen. It is pale green, rarely pale pink, and is frequently ornamented with golden spots. A black transverse band edged with gold is on the abdomen. Below this black abdominal band lies another one in blue. The pupa has very few projections; most notably, it is suspended by a long cremaster from a button of silk. As such, the pupa resembles a pendant.

In general, the pupa of the queen is smaller and more slender than that of the monarch.

=== Butterfly ===
The queen butterfly is related to two species to which it bears a striking resemblance: the monarch (Danaus plexippus) and the soldier (Danaus eresimus).

The queen is a moderately large butterfly, with an average wingspan of 3.1 inches (7.9 cm) to 3.3 inches (8.4 cm). It is easily distinguishable from its relative the monarch by its darker brown ground colour, and lack of stripes decorating the wings. The queen bears a closer resemblance to the soldier (Danaus eresimus). It possesses a very tough and flexible chitinous exoskeleton, unlike most other butterflies.

Its wing coloration varies from bright, reddish brown to rich chocolate-brown, with black marginal bands that are dotted with white or yellow. The underside of the wing resembles the upper wing, but is paler. The queen has less-prominent veins on its wings and lacks the darker, apical shading found in the monarch.

Both sexes are morphologically similar. The male's and the female's forewing lengths range from 3.7 centimetres (1.5 in) to 4.6 centimetres (1.8 in), with a mean length of 4.2 centimetres (1.7 in). The antennae lack scales. Although all danaids have two pairs of walking legs, the forelegs, the first pair located on the prothoracic segment of the abdomen, are reduced and not used for locomotion. The forelegs are relatively smaller in the male than in the female. The female uses its short forelegs to scratch the surface of a leaf to determine which ones are suitable hosts for its eggs. In both sexes, the reduced forelegs lack claws.

The male queen has an androconium, a specialized, scale-covered scent-pouch, on each of its dorsal hindwings. The positions and structures of androconia are used to identify different genera. The male also has an extensible hair-pencil on each side of its abdomen, which exudes sex pheromones. The abdominal hair-pencils, when in contact with the androconium scales, are able to disseminate pheromones near the female at integral stages of courtship.

== Distribution and habitat ==
The queen belongs to a family (Danaidae) that is common to both New and Old Worlds, specifically found throughout the tropics and into the temperate regions of the Americas, Asia, and Africa. Stray specimens are found in Europe. The queen is chiefly a tropical species. In the US, it is usually confined to the southern portion of the country. It can be found regularly in peninsular Florida and southern Georgia, as well as in the southern portions of Texas, New Mexico, Arizona, and California. Occasionally, the subspecies of the queen can be found somewhat north, in Kansas, Colorado, and Utah. Periodically, a stray may be found in the Midwest, such as in Missouri. The berenice subspecies is found largely in the Southeast and the strigosus in the Southwest. The queen is also found in Cuba.

It is more common in southern Central America, with numbers beginning to rise in Mexico. The queen can be found as far south as Argentina. Although the queen does not undertake dramatic migrations like the monarch, most undertake short-distance travel at tropical latitudes in areas that have a distinct dry season. During those periods, the queen will fly from lowlands to high elevations.

Throughout its distribution, the queen can be found on open land, in meadows, fields, and marshes. It displays a more xeric preference in Hispaniola and will fly to the edge of, but seldom penetrate, hammocks and forests. In the southern US, the queen prefers open woodland, fields, and desert.

== Food sources and host plants ==
=== Larval host plants and food sources ===
The queen larvae feed on Apocynaceae (milkweeds and dogbanes). It can survive on a number of hosts. Common plants include butterflyweed (Asclepias tuberosa) and bloodflower (Asclepias curassavica). In the West Indies, blunt-leaved milkweed (Asclepias amplexicaulis) and honey vine (Cynanchum laeve) are favored. The caterpillar has also been observed on Asclepias nivea, Calotropis procera, Asclepias humistrata, and Apocynaceae nerium. Other reported host genera include Apocynum, Cynanchum (former Sarcostemma species), Gonolobus, and Stapelia.

=== Adult food sources and host plants ===
As an adult, its feeding habits are less specific. The butterfly feeds predominantly on nectar from flowers and dead foliage, but can also feed on rotting fruit, sweat, and dry or wet dung, among other substances.

Even as an adult, the queen is drawn to milkweeds (Apocynaceae). However, the butterfly is also attracted to the Nerium, Funastrum, Vincetoxicum, Philabertia, Stapelia.

In addition to the above food sources, males are attracted to Heliotropium, Eupatorium, Senecio, and Crotalaria, plants known to contain the alkaloid lycopsamine. The alkaloid and other precursor compounds from these plants are used to create pheromones used to attract mates. Pheromone precursors are predominantly obtained from Boraginaceae, Asteraceae, and Fabaceae.

== Defense ==
The queen is one of many insects that derives chemical defenses against its predators from its food plant. Most of the toxic cardenolides that make queens so unpalatable to its predators are sequestered from larval host plants.

=== Mimicry in cardenolide-derived defense ===
For quite some time, the queen had been regarded as highly unpalatable to its vertebrate (mainly avian) predators. This is due to the fact that the queen, like its cousin the monarch, feeds largely on Asclepiads. As the queen and the monarch are closely related, it was assumed that the queen also possesses the ability to effectively sequester and store cardenolides present in milkweeds. As such, the queen and the Florida viceroy was long regarded a classic model-mimic example of Batesian mimicry, similar to the relationship exhibited by the monarch and the viceroy.

However, the unexpected failure of birds to reject successive queens in an experimental setting called into question the legitimacy of this relationship. In fact, experimental evidence suggested that Florida viceroys could be significantly more unpalatable than representative queens. Because experimental evidence showed sampled queens were significantly less distasteful than viceroys, it was purported that Florida viceroys and queens were Müllerian co-mimics. Furthermore, evidence from this study led to the hypothesis that the queen actually enjoys an asymmetric mimicry relationship, gaining an advantage from flying in the company of the relatively more unpalatable viceroy.

==== Palatability spectrum ====
Further experimentation suggested that chemical defense of queens is highly labile. It was shown that queens reared on the high-cardenolide A. curassavica sequester and store levels of cardenolides similar to those found in monarchs. These butterflies were regarded as very distasteful and were largely rejected by avian predators. Furthermore, those that were eaten elicited high rates of distress behavior. However, queens reared on S. clausum, a larval host plant known to be a very poor cardenolide source, contain no detectable cardenolide and are essentially palatable to predators. These highly variable responses of avian predators to queens reared on different plants suggest the existence of a food-plant-related palatability spectrum in Florida queen butterflies.

Micro-geographic differences in the environment lead to variation in the dynamics of mimetic relationships even at a local level. Spatiotemporal variation throughout different areas lead to large differences in unpalatability of queens separated by only a few kilometers. This extensive variation supports the idea that automimicy occurs at the intrapopulation level – palatable queens mimic individuals that have higher cardenolide content. By extension, interspecific mimicry is also highly variable. At hydric inland sites, which contain large numbers of A. curassavica, queens and viceroys are distasteful Müllerian mimics of one another, while at coastal sites queens probably serve as the palatable Batesian mimics of viceroys.

=== Noncardenolide-derived defense ===
Queen unpalatability does not directly mirror either food plant or butterfly cardenolide content. Evidence suggests that the interaction of cardenolides and noncardenolides are utilized for chemical defenses in milkweed butterflies.

Wild queens that fed upon S. clausum as larvae but had access to adult-obtained compounds, such as the pyrrolizidine alkaloids (PAs) used for pheromone production, were observed to be significantly less palatable to avian predators than butterflies without chemical defenses. As such, these alkaloids, which are known to deter spider predators, may make a substantial contribution to queen distastefulness.

== Mating ==
Males patrol all day to seek females. Females can mate up to 15 times, a significantly higher number than other members of Lepidoptera. Courtship and mating typically happen in the afternoon. Once a male and a female mate, the butterflies may remain coupled for more than an hour. Mated pairs often rest on foliage high up in a tree. Later, the female will fly closer to the ground than normal to find a suitable host for egg deposition.

=== Courtship ===
During courtship, which occurs while both butterflies are in flight, the male everts his hair-pencils and brushes them against the female's antennae. This act is called "hair-pencilling." The secretion associated with these hair-pencils plays an important role in seducing the female. When the female comes to rest, the male hovers closely above her and subjects her to further "hair-pencilling" before alighting next to the female and copulating with her. Afterwards, the two engage in a postnuptial flight - the male flies with the female dangling beneath him.

==== Pheromone ====
The chemicals that comprise the pheromone are secreted by trichogen cells, which are located at the base of each hair-pencil. This liquid secretion moves from these cells, through the cuticle of the hairs, to coat the numerous free, cuticular dust particles that adhere to the hair-pencil surface. Two of the chemicals that comprise this secretion have been identified – a crystalline pyrrolizidinone (ketone) and a viscous terpenoid alcohol (diol). The diol imparts a stickiness that allows the secretion to stay on the dust, and the dust on antennae. The ketone is a releaser pheromone, inducing females to mate. Although insufficient levels of ketone present in the dust particle correlates to lower seductive capacity in the male, some males with low levels of ketone – and even some without hair-pencils – have been known to mate successfully with females. This suggests that although hair-pencil pheromones are of major importance, they are not absolutely essential to mating.

==== Importance of hair-pencils ====
Many butterflies possess extrusible brushlike structures, called hair-pencils. In the queen, the hair-pencils, which are present in the posterior abdomen in the male, are tucked away when the male is not interacting with the female. As such, these organs are thought to serve as important tools for pheromone dissemination during courtship.

Hair-pencils play an important role in courtship success. Although the lack of hair-pencils does not affect the rate at and enthusiasm with which males pursue females, males without hair-pencils experience significantly lower success in achieving copulation. Male queen butterflies with physically normal but chemically deficient hair-pencils also suffer from lower mating success. In addition, adult female queens whose antennae have been blocked are not receptive to advances from competent male queens. However, physical contact between the male's hair-pencil and the female's antennae does not affect a male's mating success. Males without hair-pencils are no less fertile than males with hair-pencils.

That actively hair-pencilling males emit a very definite odor that can even be perceived by humans also supports the idea that it is not the hair-pencil itself that is important in courtship, but rather, the pheromone which the hair-pencil transports.

== Gallery ==
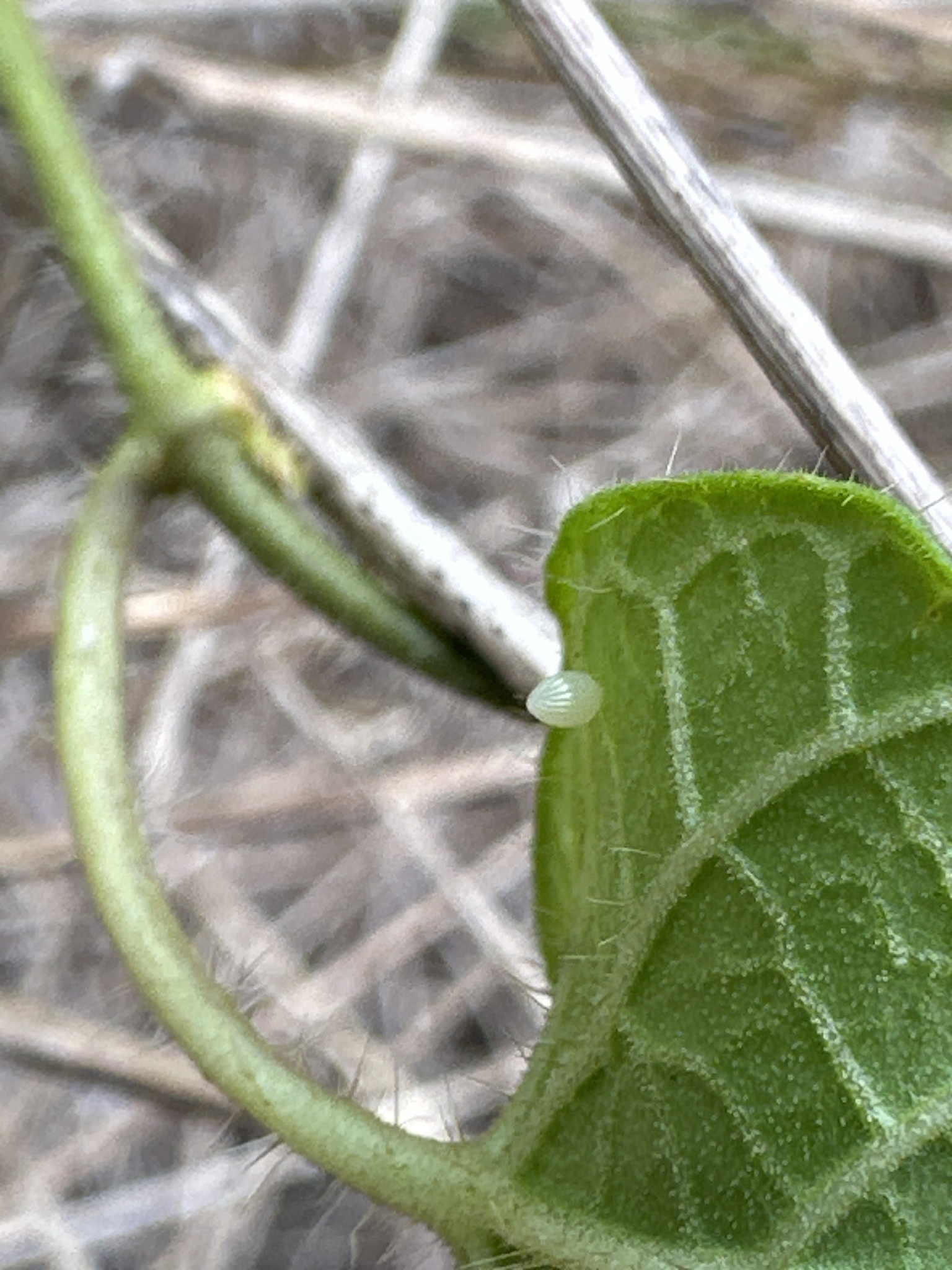
Egg

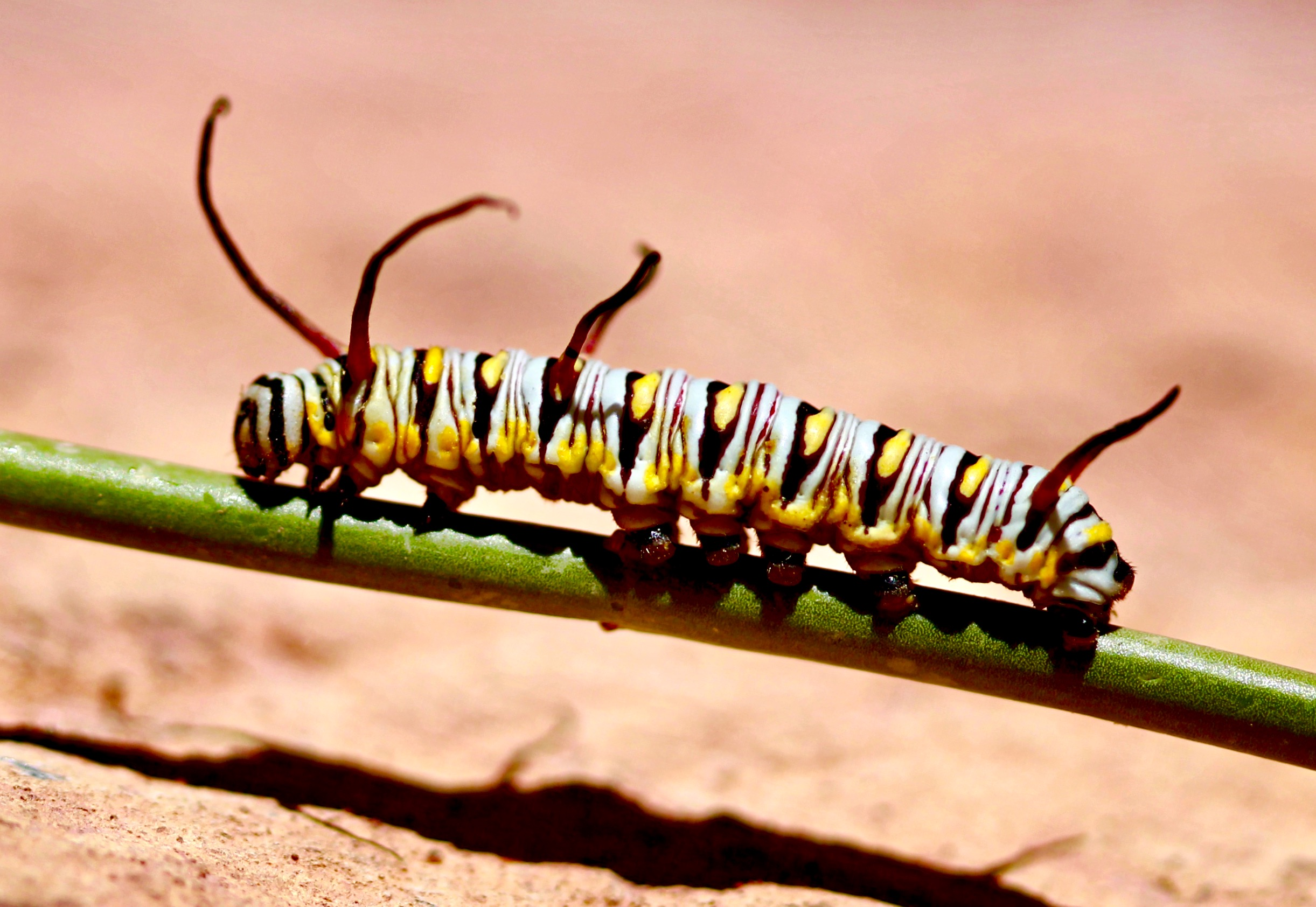
Fifth instar caterpillar

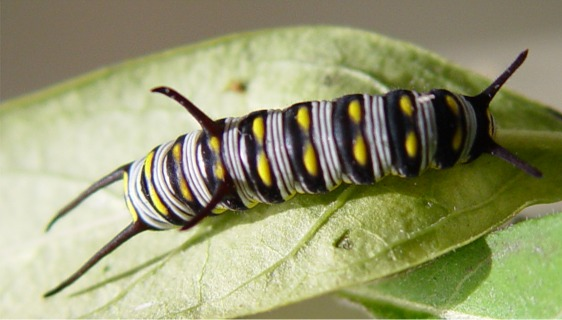
Caterpillar with black stripes

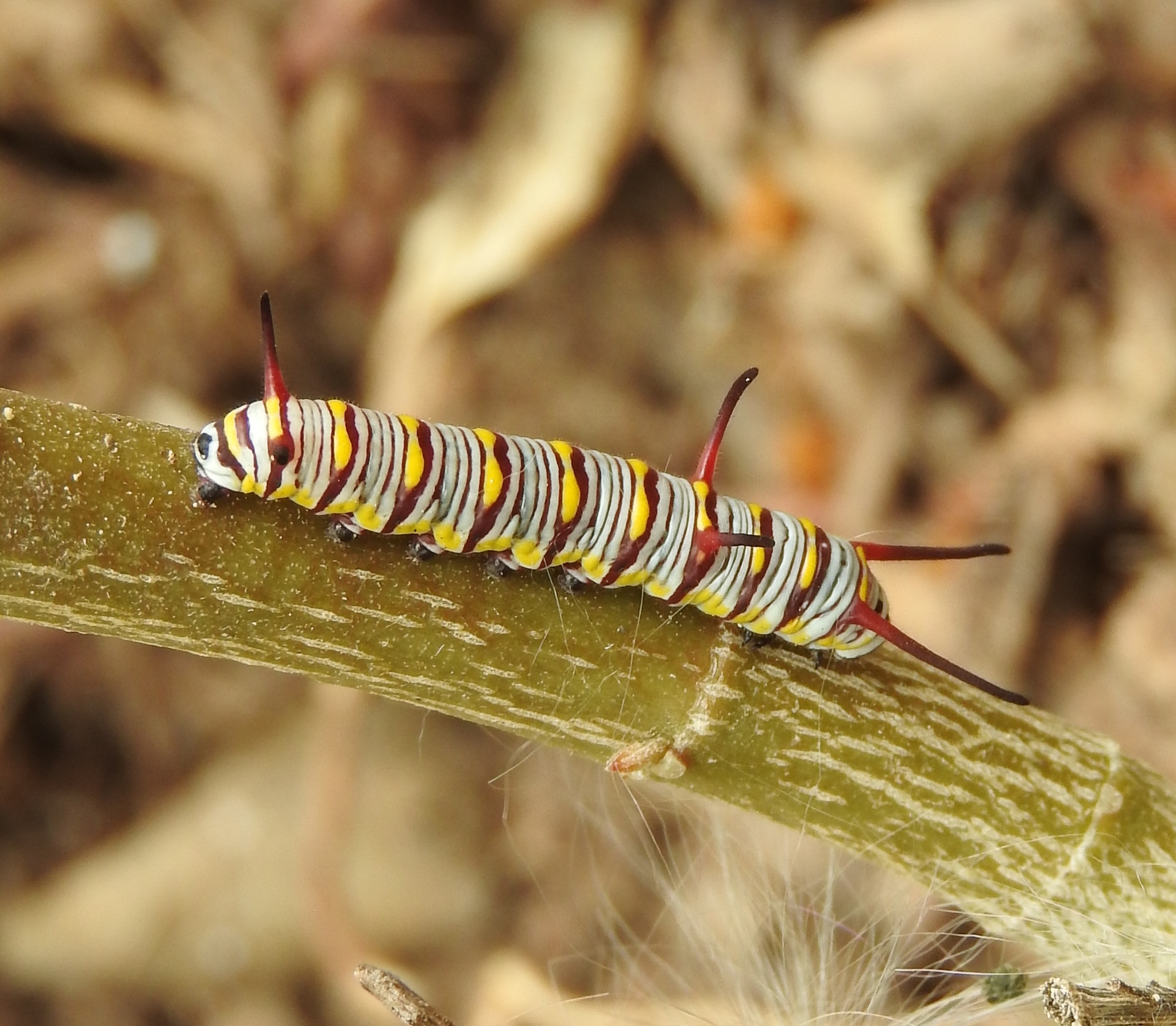
Caterpillar with red stripes

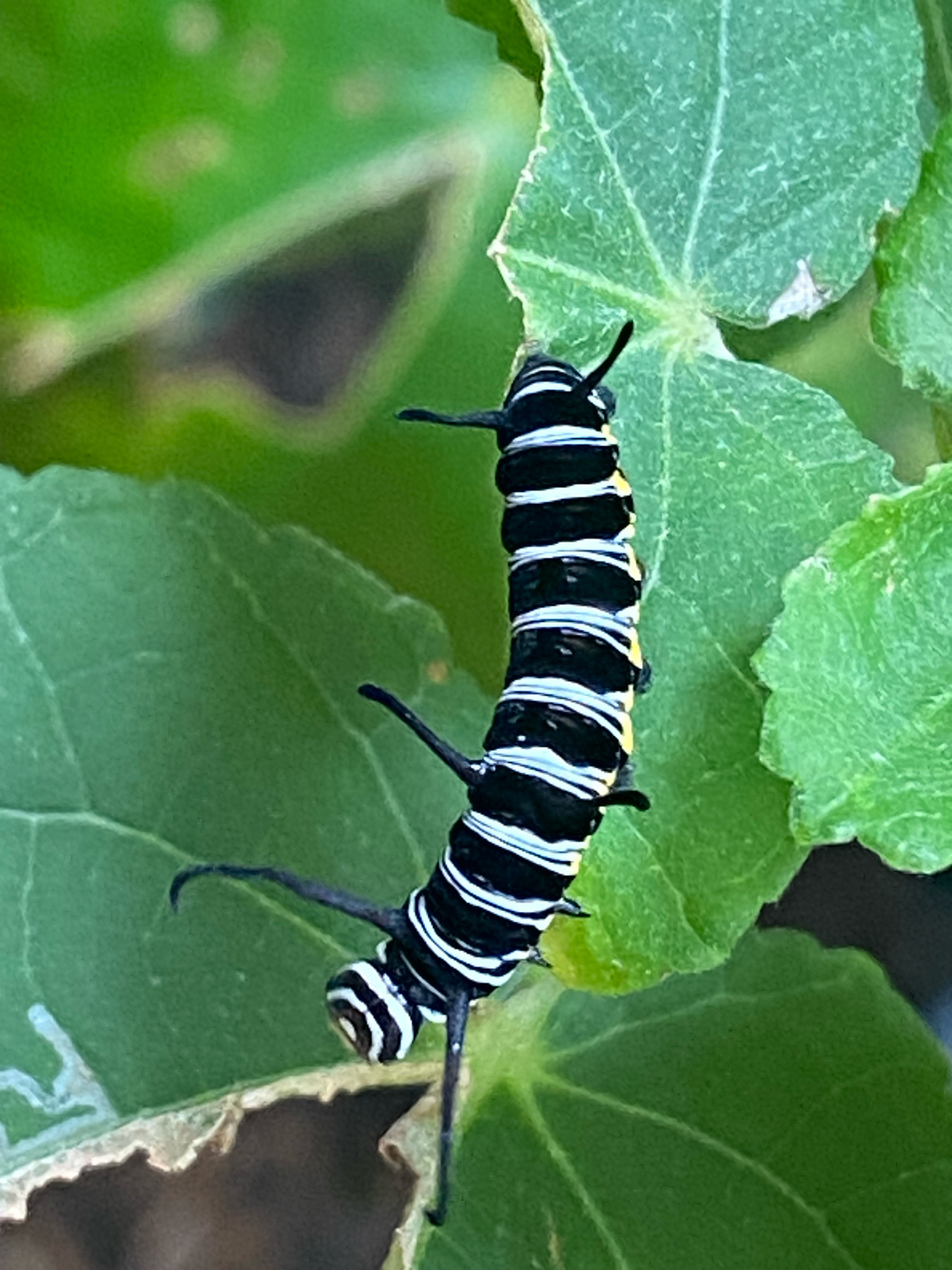
Dark caterpillar

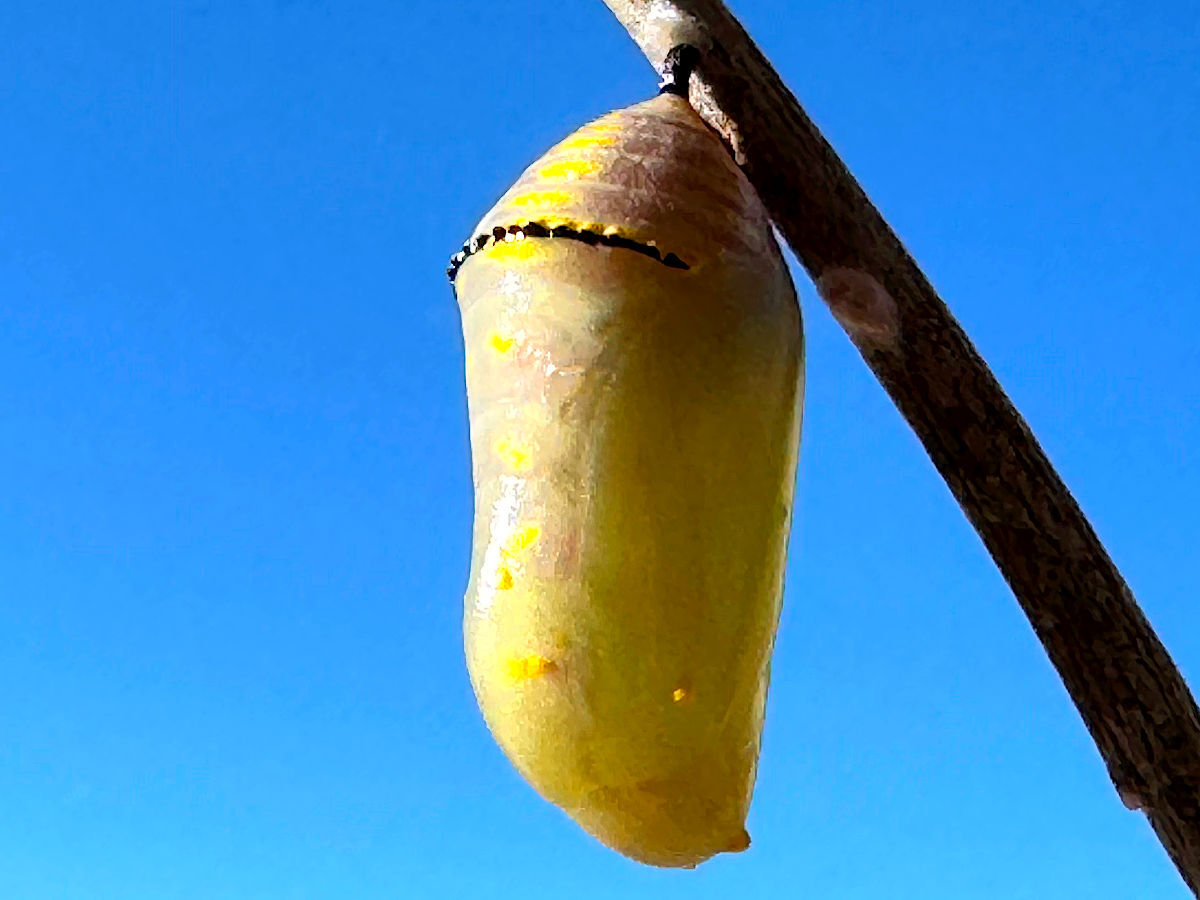
Day-old chrysalis

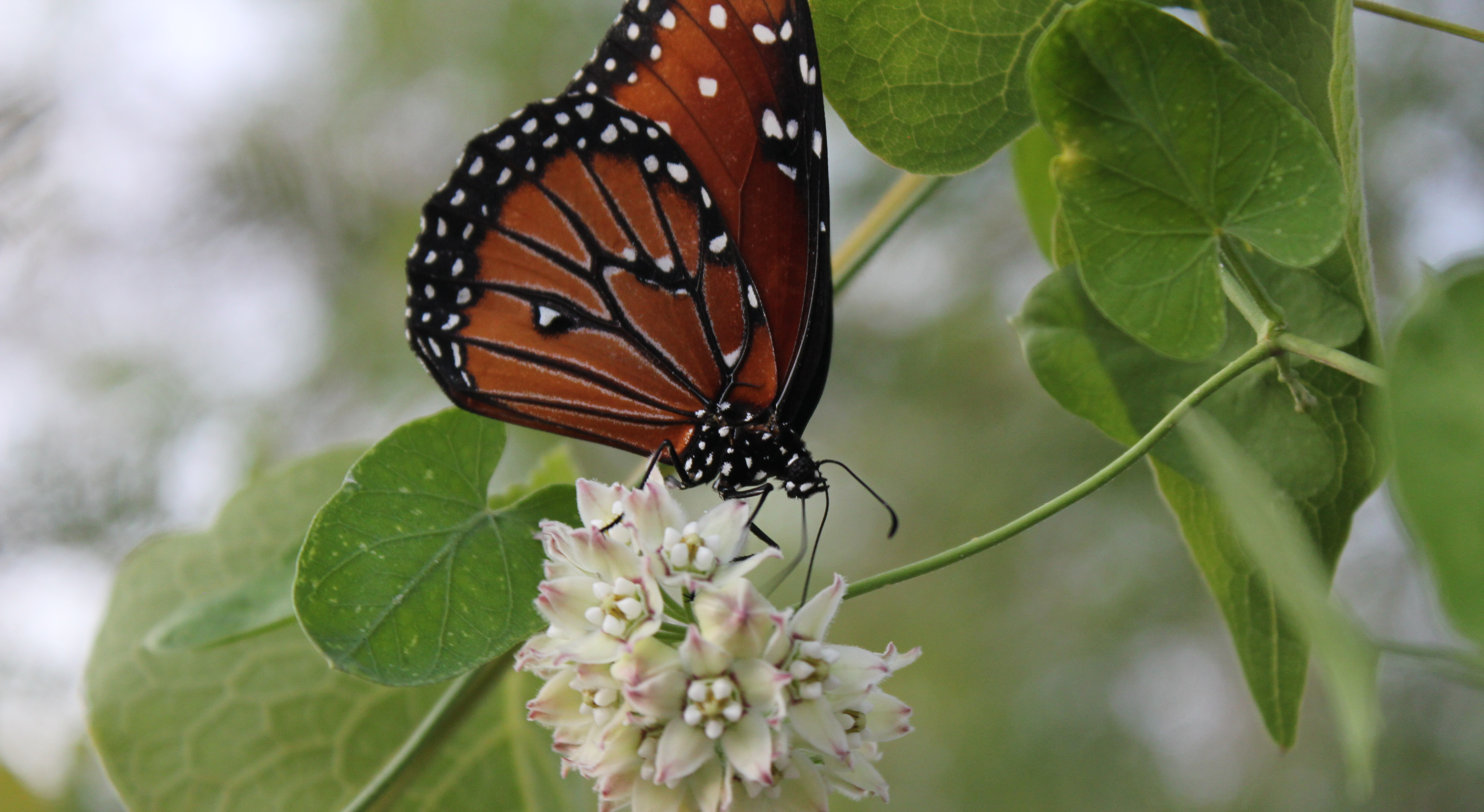
Adult feeding on Funastrum cynanchoides

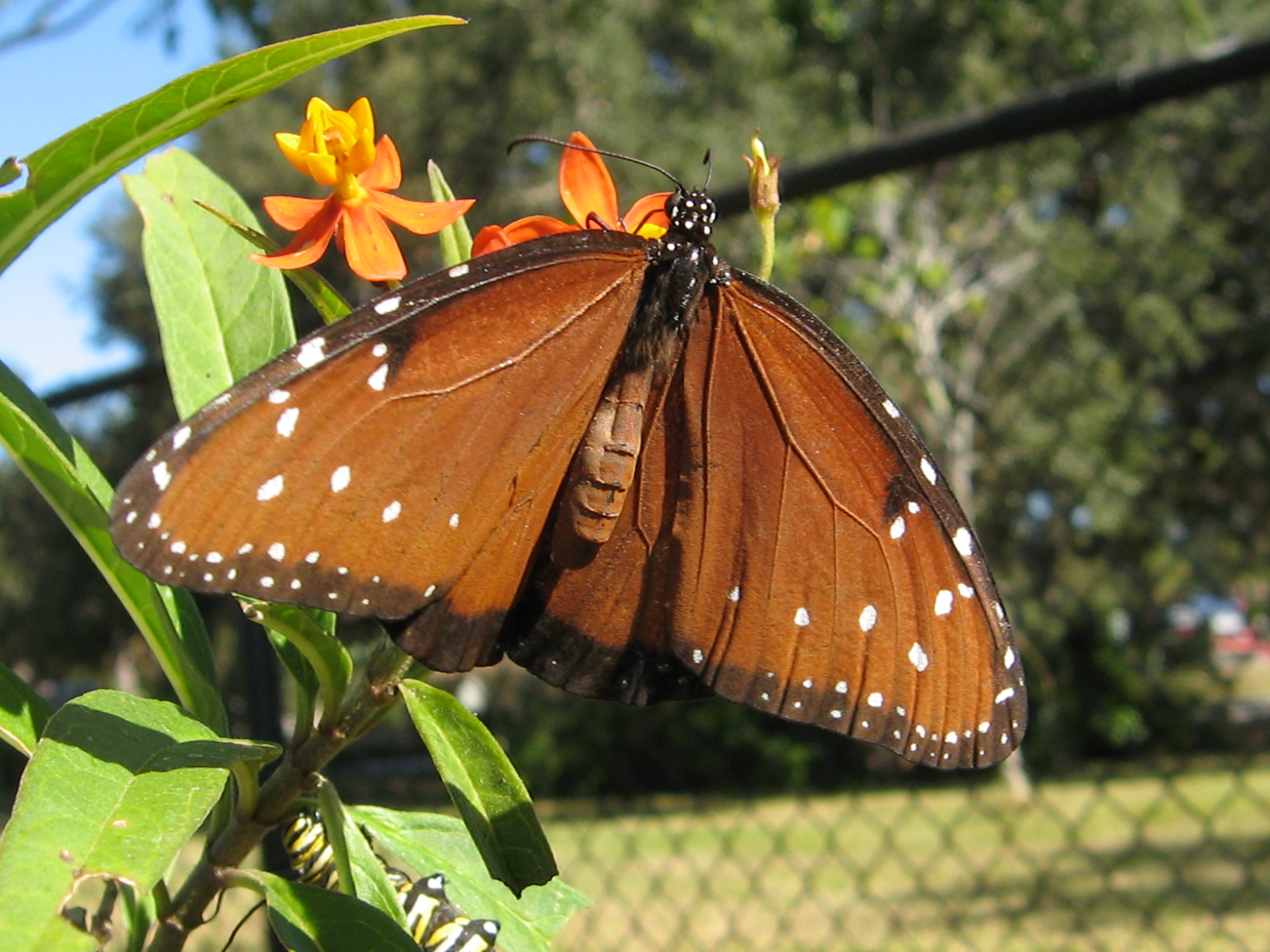
Adult feeding on milkweed
