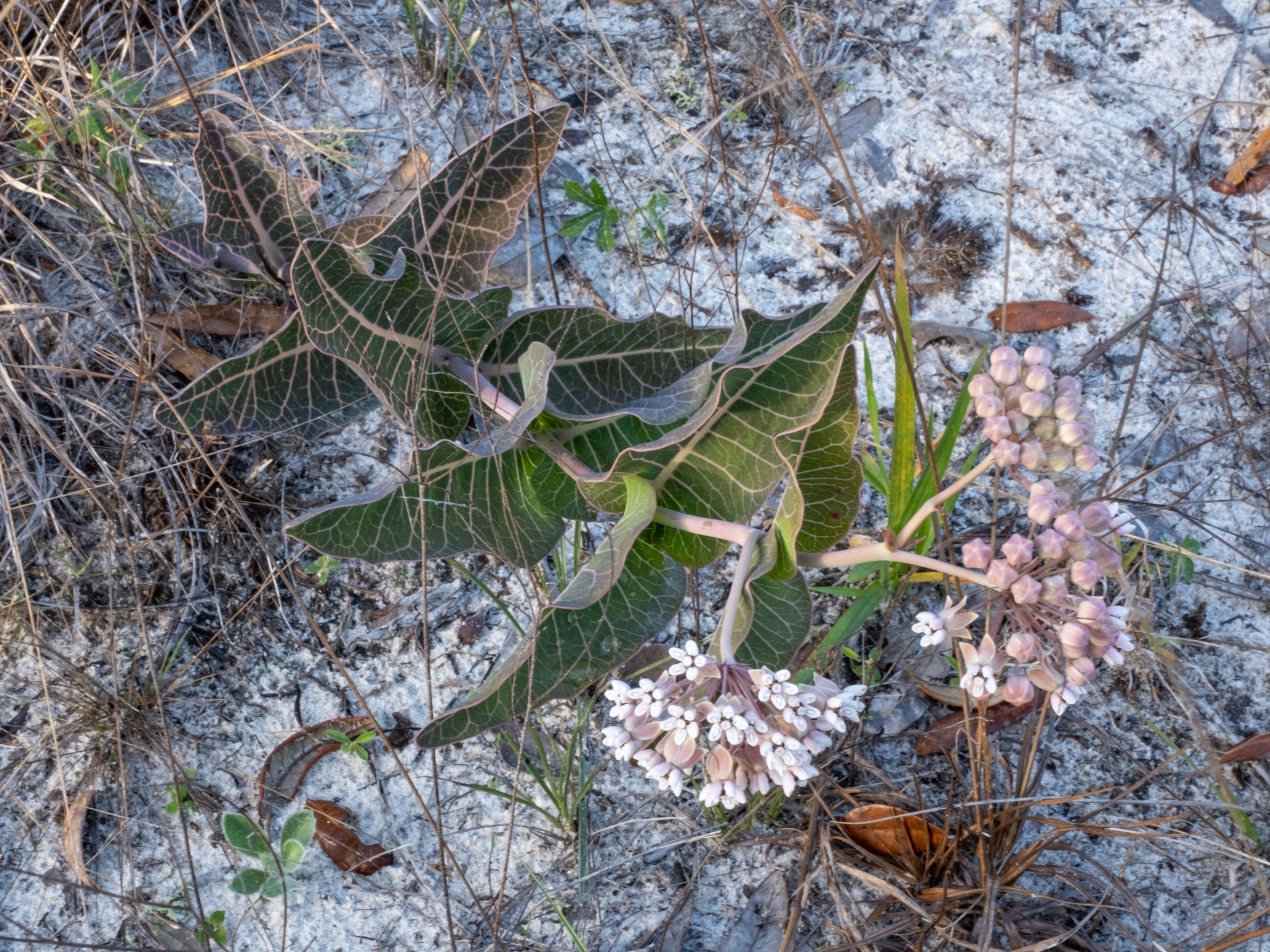

Conservation status
- Apparently Secure (NatureServe)

Scientific classification
- Kingdom: Plantae
- Clade: Embryophytes
- Clade: Tracheophytes
- Clade: Angiosperms
- Clade: Eudicots
- Clade: Asterids
- Order: Gentianales
- Family: Apocynaceae
- Genus: Asclepias
- Species: A. humistrata

Binomial name
- Asclepias humistrata Walter

= Asclepias humistrata =

Species of plant

Asclepias humistrata, or the sandhill milkweed, is a species of milkweed plant. It is also known as pinewoods milkweed and pink-veined milkplant. It belongs in the subfamily Asclepiadoideae. It is native to the southeastern United States. It is found in well-drained areas such as sandy woodlands, sandy hills, and Florida scrub.

A. humistrata serves as a host to the queen butterfly and monarch butterfly species.

== Description ==
A. humistrata may grow from 0.3 to 0.9 meters (0.98 to 2.95 ft) tall. The leaves are oppositely arranged, in 5 to 8 pairs. They are ovate in shape and may be 6 to 10 centimeters (approximately 2 to 4 inches) long and 4.5 to 8.5 centimeters (about 1.77 to 3.35 inches) wide. The flowers are pink lavender and white. It blooms in spring and summer.

== Distribution and habitat ==
This species in endemic to the southeastern region of the United States. Its range extends from North Carolina south to Florida and westward to Louisiana.

A. humistrata is found in environment types such as sand dunes, scrub oak sand ridges, pine-palmetto thickets, and longleaf pine-scrub oak ridges. It has also been observed in disturbed areas, such as alongside roads.
