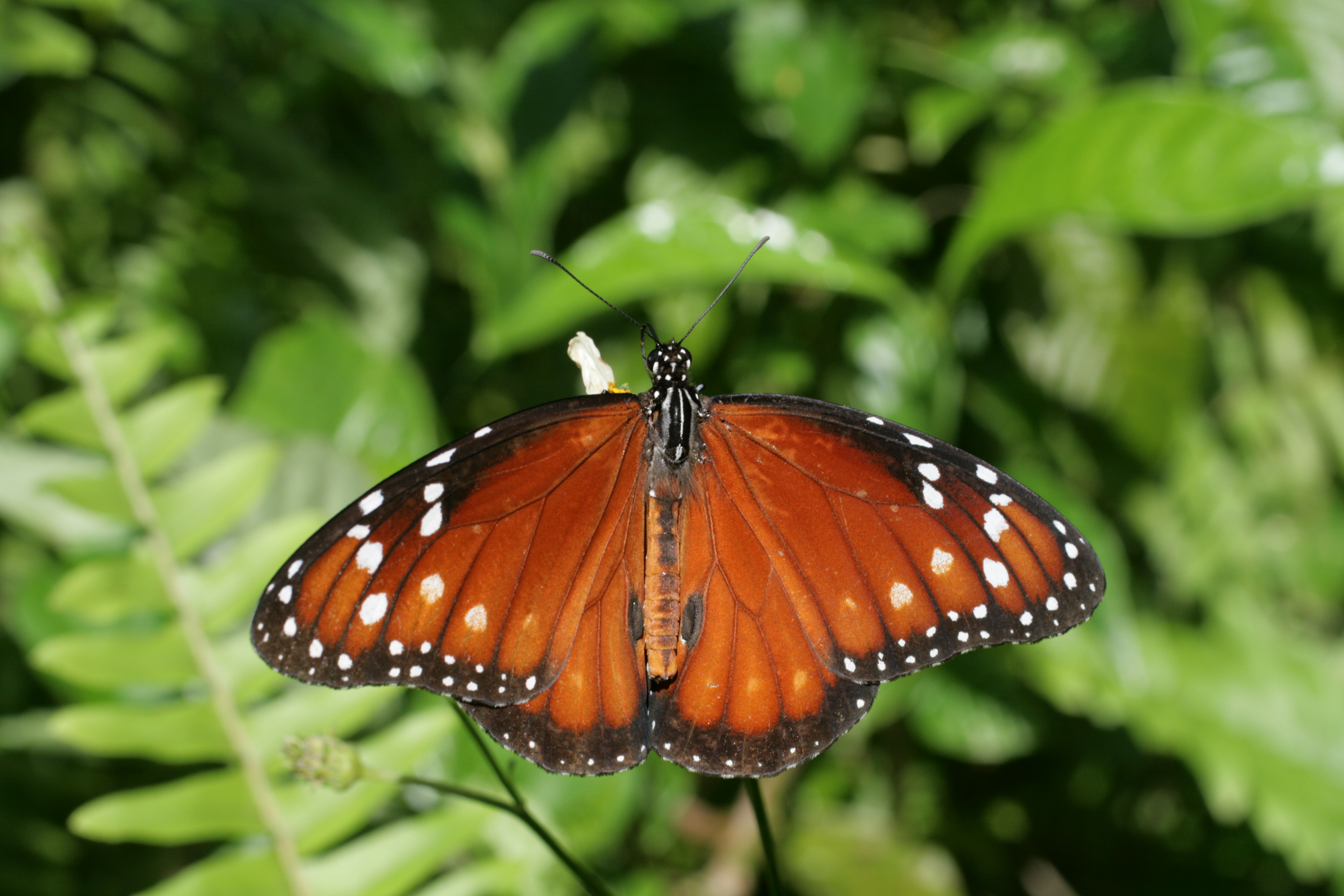

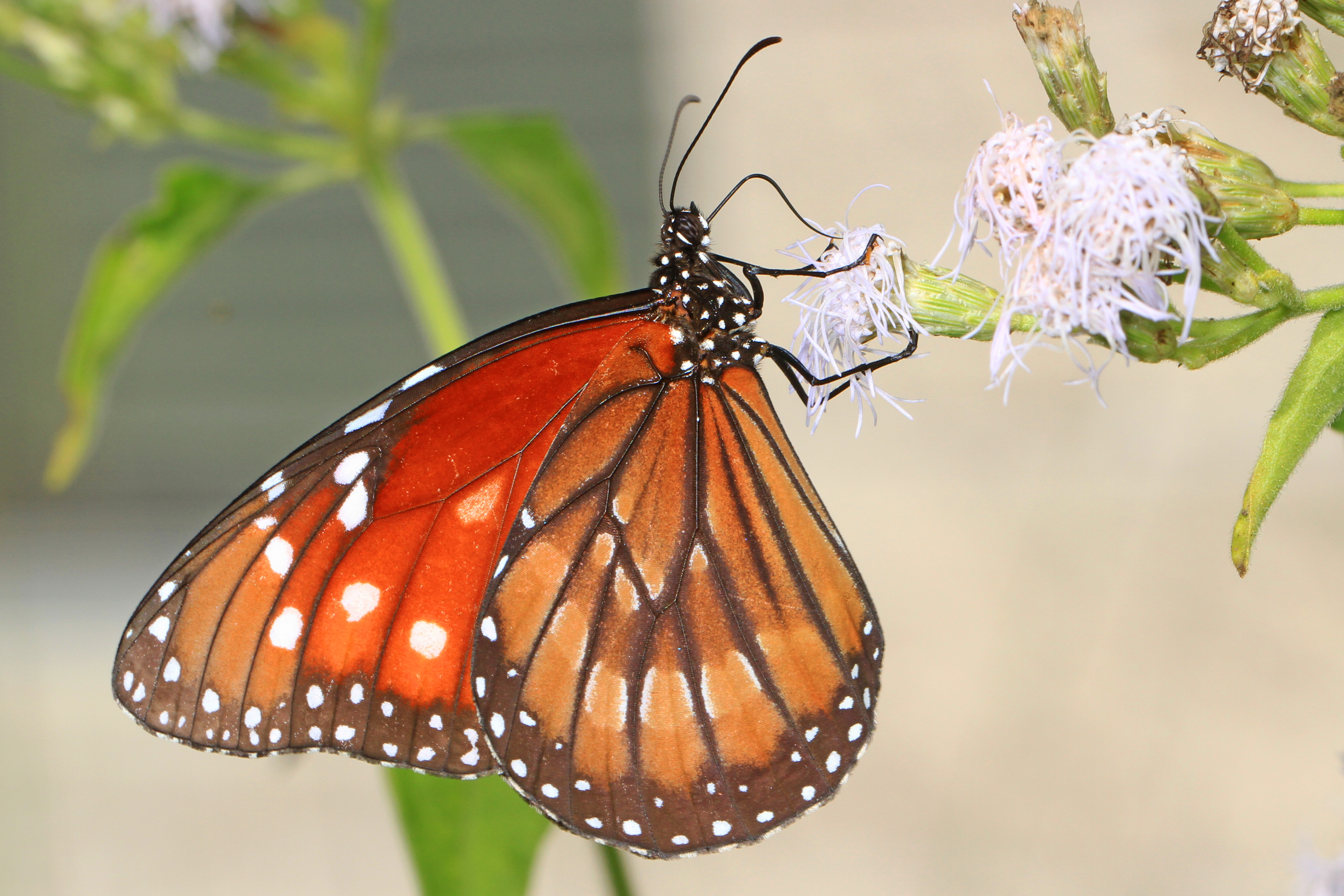

Conservation status
- Secure (NatureServe)

Scientific classification
- Kingdom: Animalia
- Phylum: Arthropoda
- Class: Insecta
- Order: Lepidoptera
- Family: Nymphalidae
- Genus: Danaus
- Species: D. eresimus

Binomial name
- Danaus eresimus (Cramer, [1777])

= Danaus eresimus =

Soldier

Species of butterfly

Danaus eresimus, the soldier or tropical queen, is a North American, Caribbean, and South American butterfly in the family Nymphalidae.

Their flight is slow and they are reasonably easy to approach, but will fly for some distance if approached too closely.

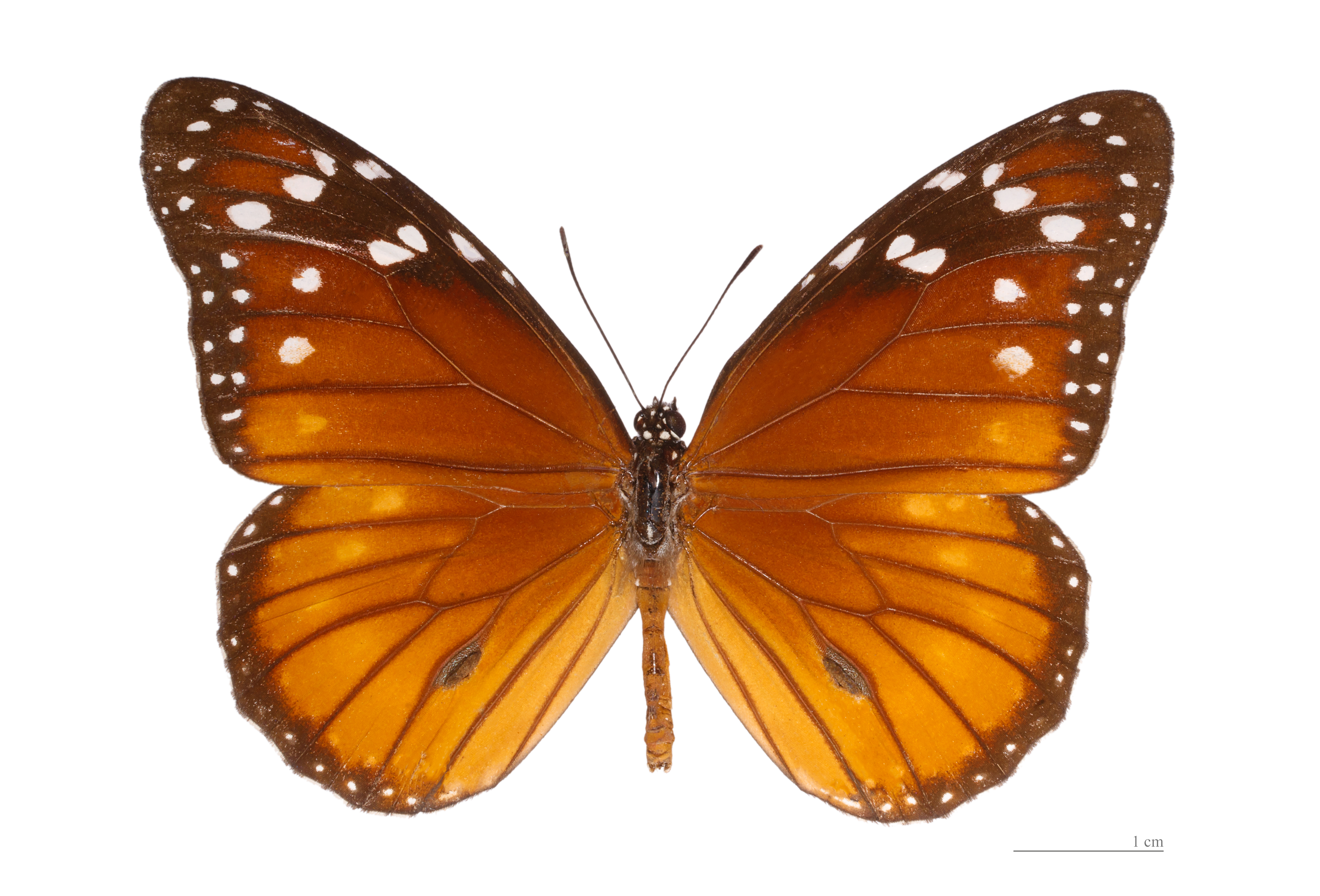
Dorsal view - MHNT

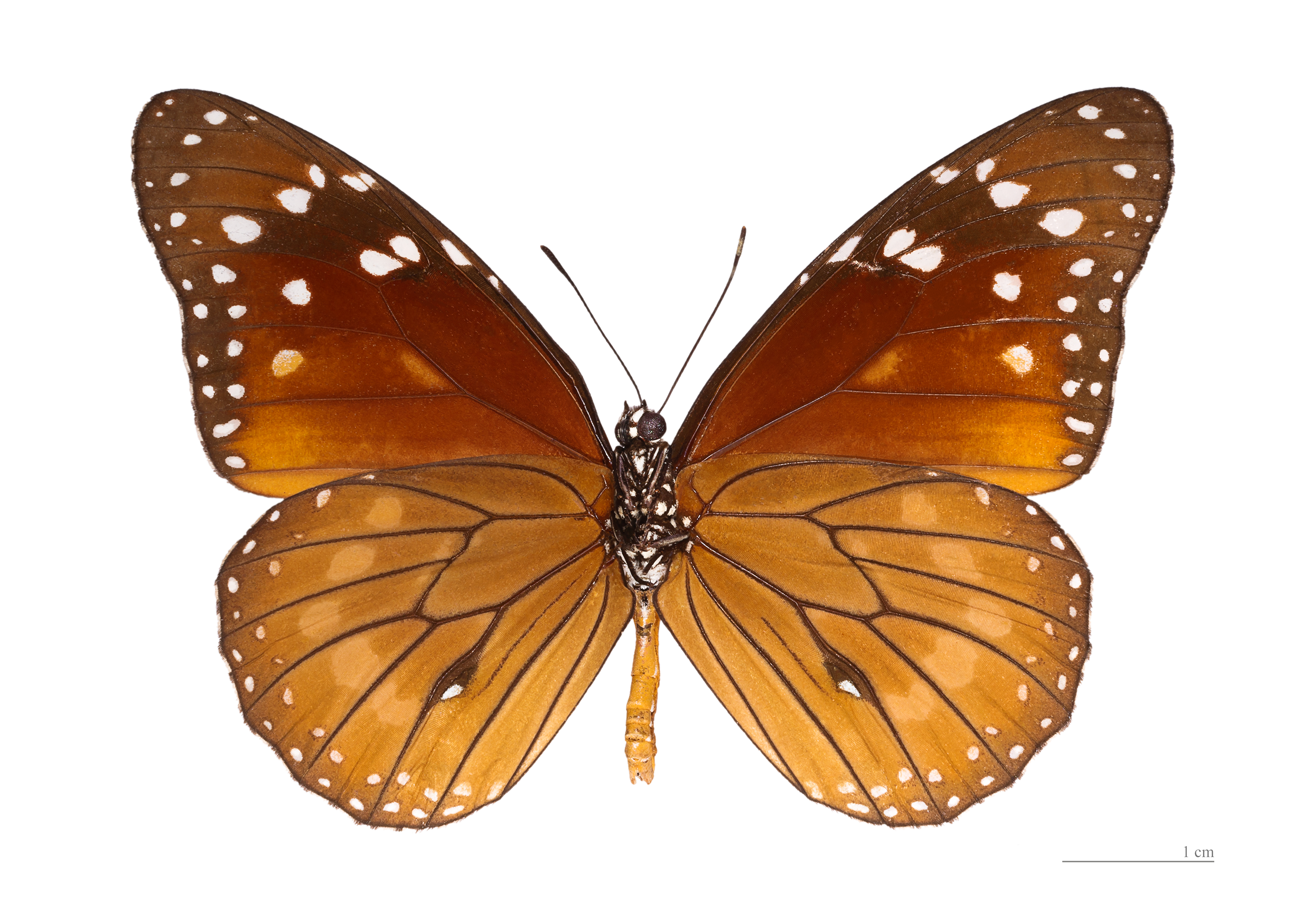
Ventral view, same specimen

== Description ==
The upperside of the wings is dark reddish brown with the forewing sometimes having white submarginal spots. The veins are lightly marked with black. Males have a black scent patch on each of the hindwings. The underside of the wings is also dark brown with a postmedian band made up of squarish spots. The soldier has a wingspan of 2 1/2 to 3 1/2 inches (64–76 mm). D. e. flexaure, formerly D. flexaure, is a subspecies which has more white markings on the hindwing underside.

== Similar species ==
Similar species in the soldier's range include the monarch (Danaus plexippus) and the queen (Danaus gilippus).

The monarch is more orange, has heavier black-lined veins, and the underside of the wings is a pale yellowish color.

The queen has nearly no black-marked veins, and has white forewing submarginal spots on both surfaces of the wings.

== Habitat ==
The soldier may be found in a variety of open, subtropical habitats such as citrus groves, weedy water edges where host plants occur, dry fields, etc.

== Flight ==
This butterfly may be encountered from February to December in southern Florida (it is most common in October to December), and from August to January in southern Texas.

== Life cycle ==
Males patrol for females. The eggs are bright orange. The black larva is banded with white and yellow stripes. It has a subdorsal row of yellowish-tan spots. There are six black, fleshy filaments, the first pair near the head, the second on the thorax, and the third at the end of the abdomen. The chrysalis is very similar to that of the monarch, often indistinguishable. It has three or more broods per year.

== Host plants ==
- Diplolepis nummerlariifolia
- Strangler vine, Morrenia odorata
- Talayote, Cynanchum racemosum
- Sodom apple, Calotropis procera
- Tropical milkweed, Asclepias curassavica
- White vine, Funastrum clausum
- West Indian pinkroot, Spigelia anthelmia

== Ecology ==
Recent field studies in Oaxaca, Mexico identified Telminostelma foetidum (Apocynaceae) as a larval host plant and nectar source for Danaus eresimus, expanding its known range of host plants beyond Asclepias and related genera.
