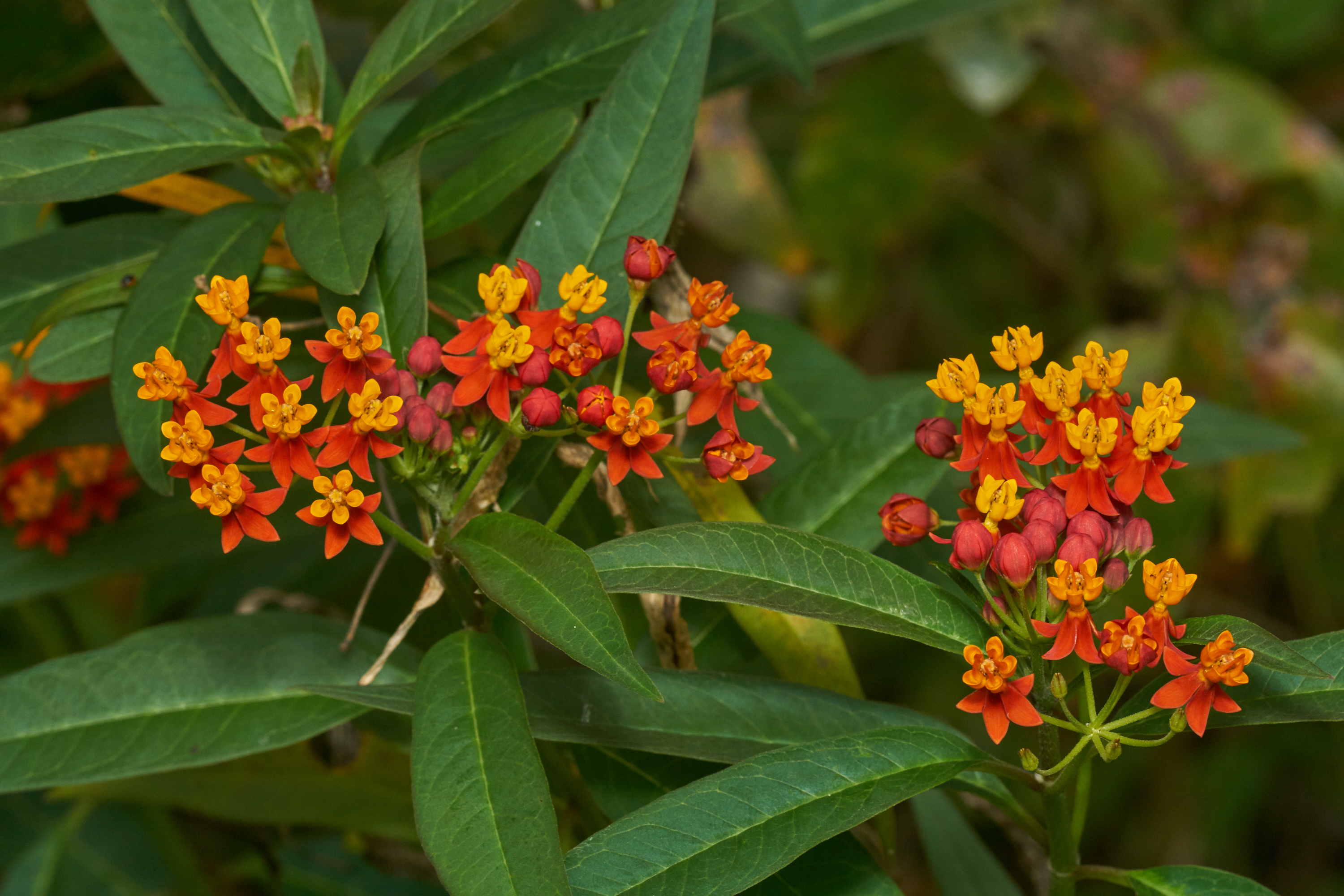

Conservation status
- Secure (NatureServe)

Scientific classification
- Kingdom: Plantae
- Clade: Tracheophytes
- Clade: Angiosperms
- Clade: Eudicots
- Clade: Asterids
- Order: Gentianales
- Family: Apocynaceae
- Genus: Asclepias
- Species: A. curassavica

Binomial name
- Asclepias curassavica L.

Synonyms
- Asclepias nivea var. curassavica (L.) Kuntze

= Asclepias curassavica =

Species of flowering plant

Asclepias curassavica, commonly known as tropical milkweed, is a flowering plant species of the milkweed genus, Asclepias. This species is one of two in the Asclepias genus considered a weed, the other being Asclepias fruticosa. It originated in South America and is now native to the American tropics and has a pantropical distribution as an introduced species. Other common names include bloodflower or blood flower, cotton bush, hierba de la cucaracha, Mexican butterfly weed, redhead, scarlet milkweed, and wild ipecacuanha.

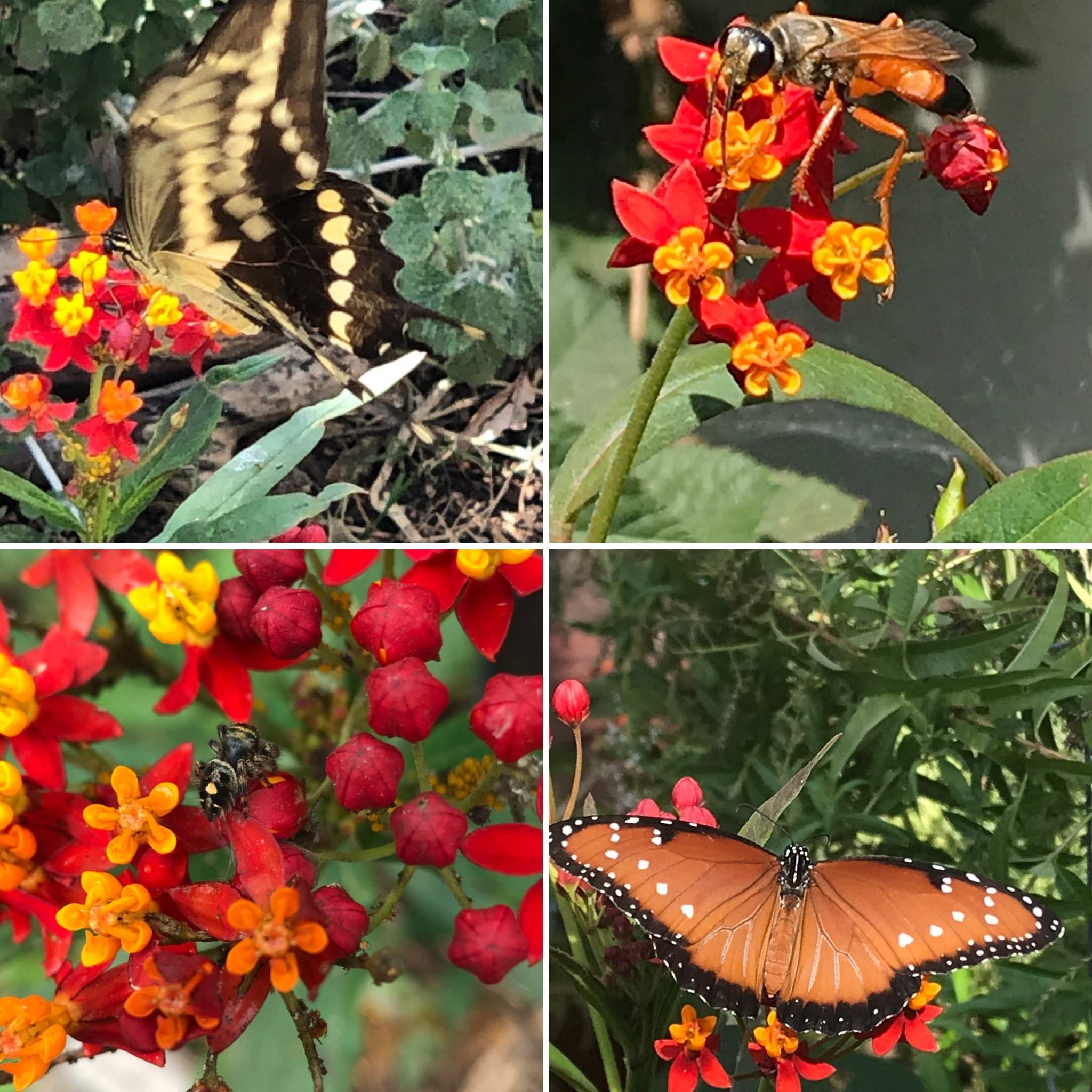
Collage of arthropods using tropical milkweed (Asclepias curassavica) for nectar or as a hunting ground

== Description ==
Typical plants are evergreen perennial subshrubs that grow up to 1 m (3.3 ft) tall and have pale gray stems. The leaves are arranged oppositely on the stems and are lanceolate or oblong-lanceolate shaped ending in acuminate or acute tips. Like other members of the genus, the sap is milky. The flowers are in cymes with 10-20 flowers each. They have purple or red corollas and corona lobes that are yellow or orange. Flowering occurs nearly year-round. The 5–10 cm (2.0–3.9 in) long, fusiform shaped fruits are called follicles. The follicles contain tan to brown seeds that are ovate in shape and 6–7 mm (0.24–0.28 in) long. The flat seeds have silky hairs that allow the seeds to float on air currents when the pod-like follicles dehisce (split open).

These plants are self-compatible (SC) and can self-pollinate if no other milkweed is near. Self-compatible plants normally rely on pollinators for the process of fertilization. When it comes down to it, they are able to self-fertilize. Based on a study, 100% of germination via self-pollination was completed within three weeks. Germination was still at a 100% success rate with cross pollination as well. Self-pollination is found to produce lesser amounts of seeds and was found to occur spontaneously in this species, which is unique being that most milkweed species are self-incompatible. The self-pollination ability aids in their success of being a weed as well.

Asclepias curassavica attracts members of the Danainae subfamily, such as the queen and monarch butterflies. Their larvae feed on Asclepias.

== Cultivation ==
Asclepias curassavica is grown as an ornamental garden plant and as a food source for some butterflies. There are a number of different cultivars with improved flower colors and shorter habit; some have bright red, yellow or orange colored flowers. The species is sometimes grown as a cut flower. However, when the stems or leaves are broken, milky sap exudes which can cause eye injury.

Cultivation of Asclepias curassavica may be harmful to the migration patterns of monarch butterflies when used in gardens outside of its native tropical range. Though public concern for the rapidly declining monarch population increased the demand and commercial availability of milkweed among nurseries in the US, the results have been mixed. While tropical milkweed may effectively sustain monarch larvae, the perennial growth of the plant takes ill effect on the monarchs' migratory patterns and may have other physiological effects. Use of the tropical milkweed in gardens has disrupted monarch migrations notably in California, Texas, Florida, and South Carolina. Unlike the milkweed species native to these locations, the tropical milkweed does not go dormant in the winter causing non-migratory groups of butterflies to form. Planting Asclepias curassavica in nonnative regions therefore remains controversial and criticized. Alternatively, native milkweed species (such as showy milkweed, narrowleaf milkweed, and desert milkweed for California) are suggested for butterfly gardens.

== Distribution ==
Asclepias curassavica is described by NatureServe as a "widespread species, ranging from southern North America through Central America and into South America."

It is an introduced species in the US states of California, Florida, Hawaii, Louisiana, Tennessee, and Texas, as well as the US unincorporated territories of Puerto Rico and the United States Virgin Islands.

It has been introduced and naturalized in the Chinese provinces of Anhui, Fujian, Guangdong, Guangxi, Guizhou, Hainan, Hubei, Hunan, Jiangsu, Jiangxi, Qinghai, Sichuan, Xizang, Yunnan, and Zhejiang, as well as in Taiwan.

Asclepias curassavica was introduced to Australia prior to 1869 and is widespread in parts of Queensland. It is considered an exotic plant, and a weed, at the Meteor Downs South Project near Rolleston, Queensland, Australia.

== Chemistry ==
Asclepias curassavica contains several cardiac glycosides, including asclepin, calotropin, uzarin and their free genins, calactin, coroglucigenin and uzarigenin. It also contains oleanolic acid, β-sitosterol, and glycosides of asclepin. The most abundant cardiac glycoside present in Asclepias curassavica leaves is voruscharin, which comprises around 40% of the total cardiac glycoside content in leaves. The sequenced genome of Asclepias curassavica provides insight into the biosynthesis of cardiac glycosides.

== Gallery ==
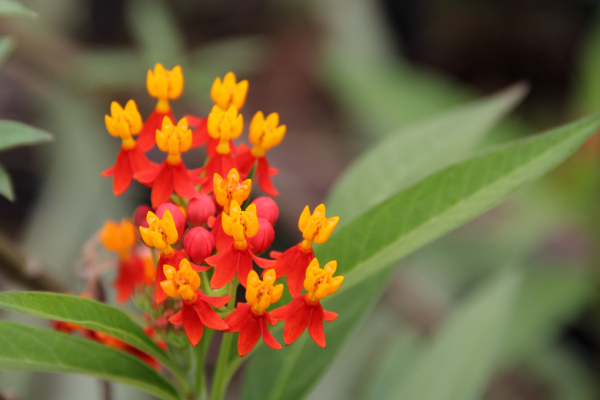
Flower from flower biew

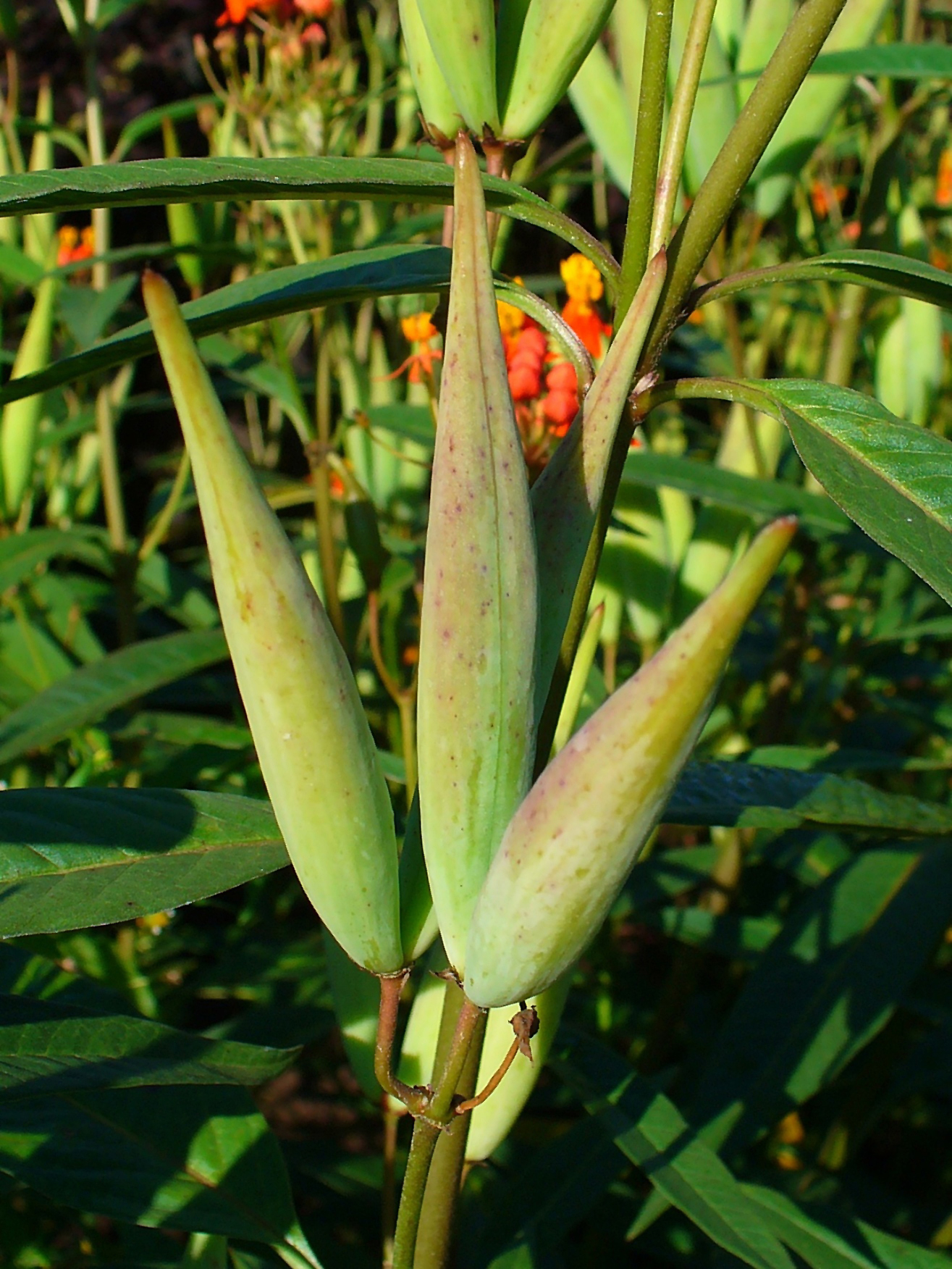
Fruits

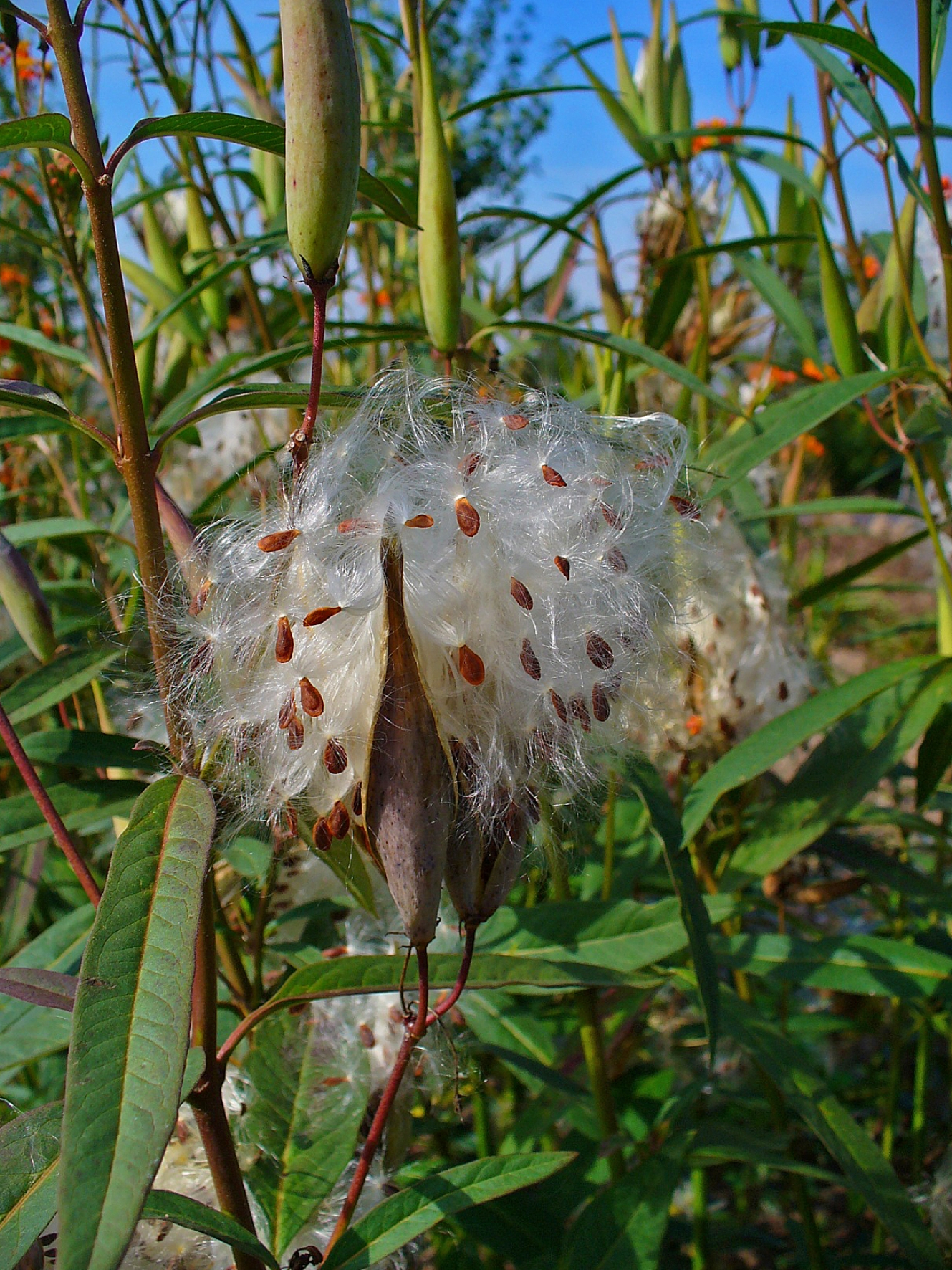
Seeds

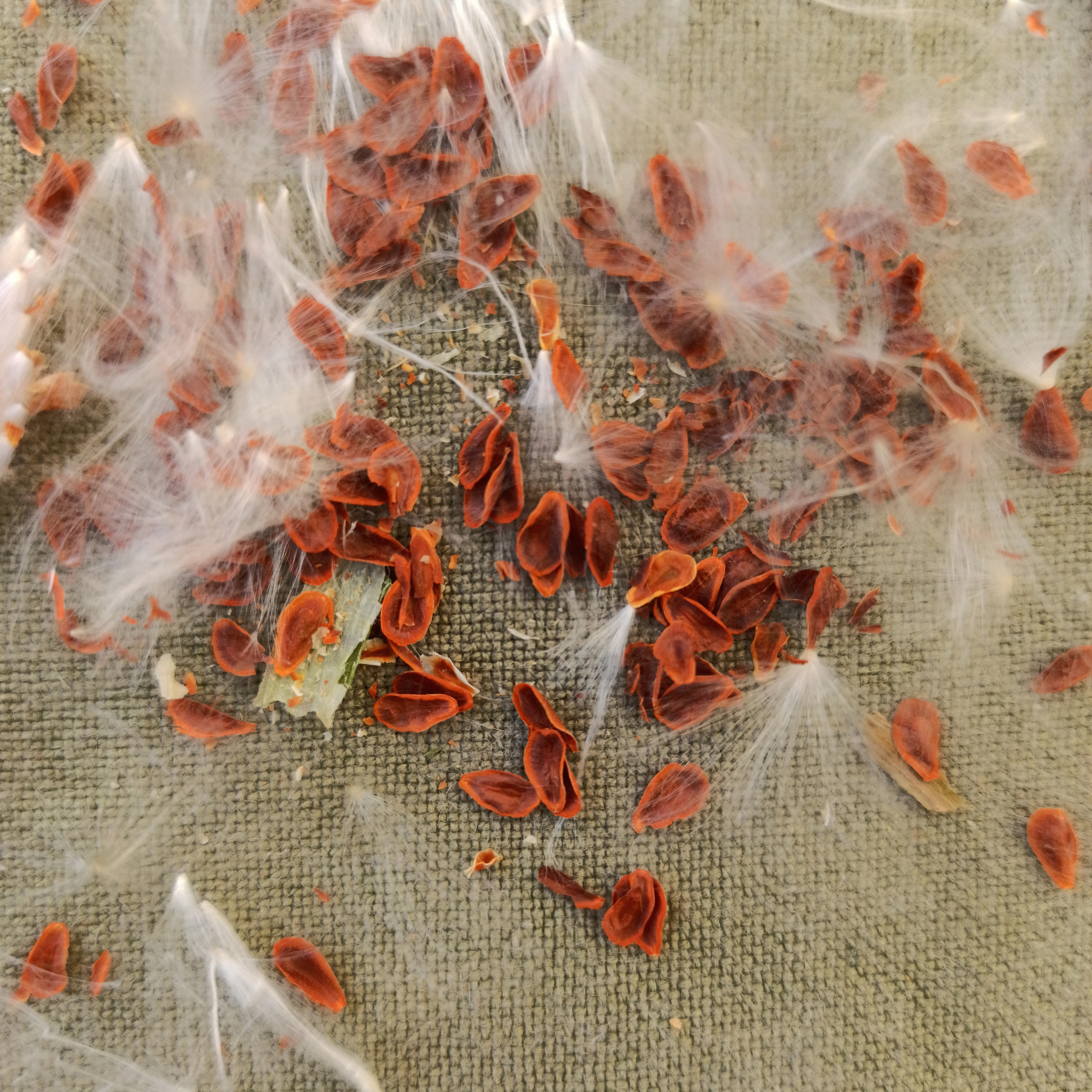
Seed with parachute

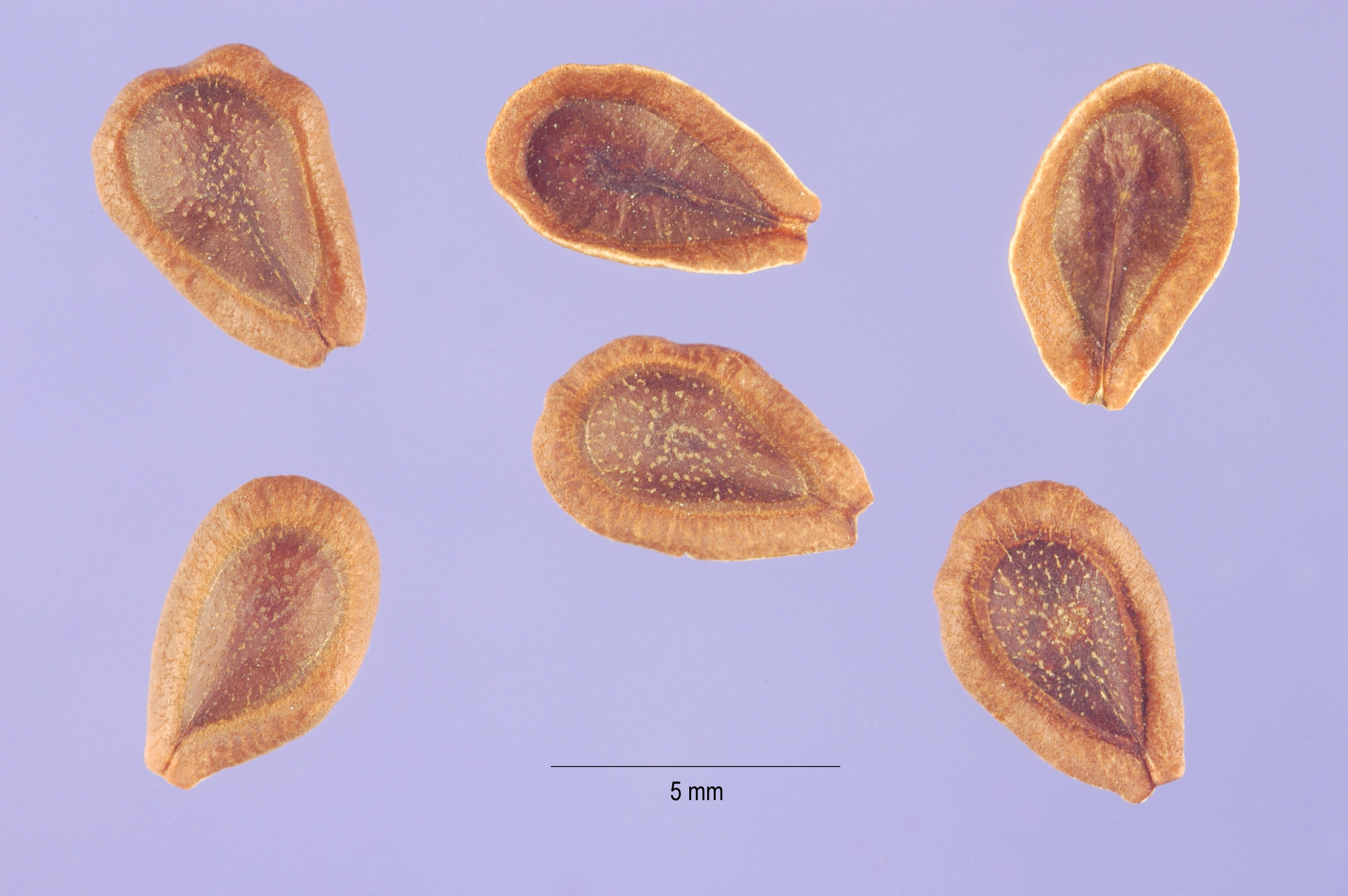
Seeds close up

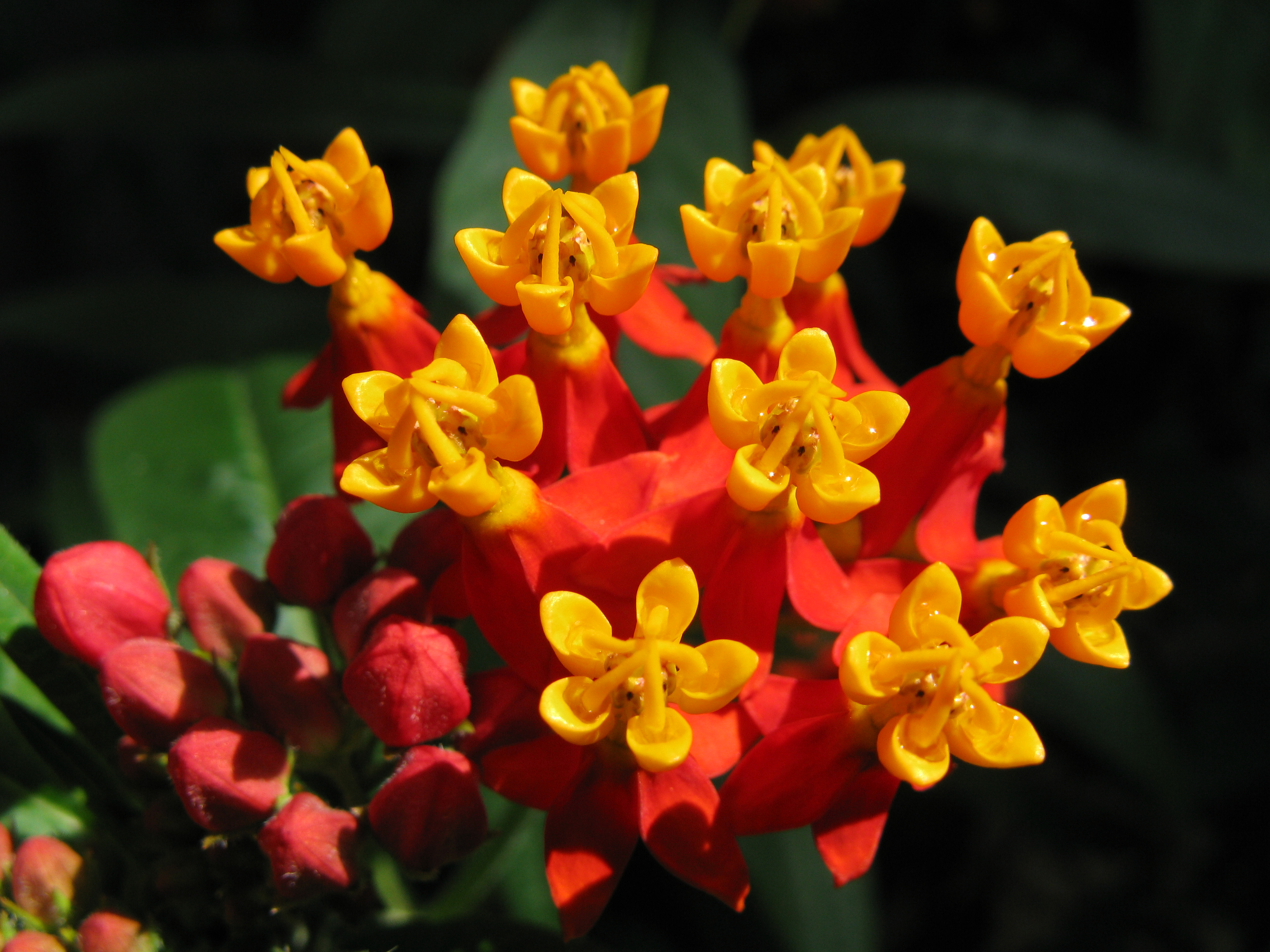
Flower closeup

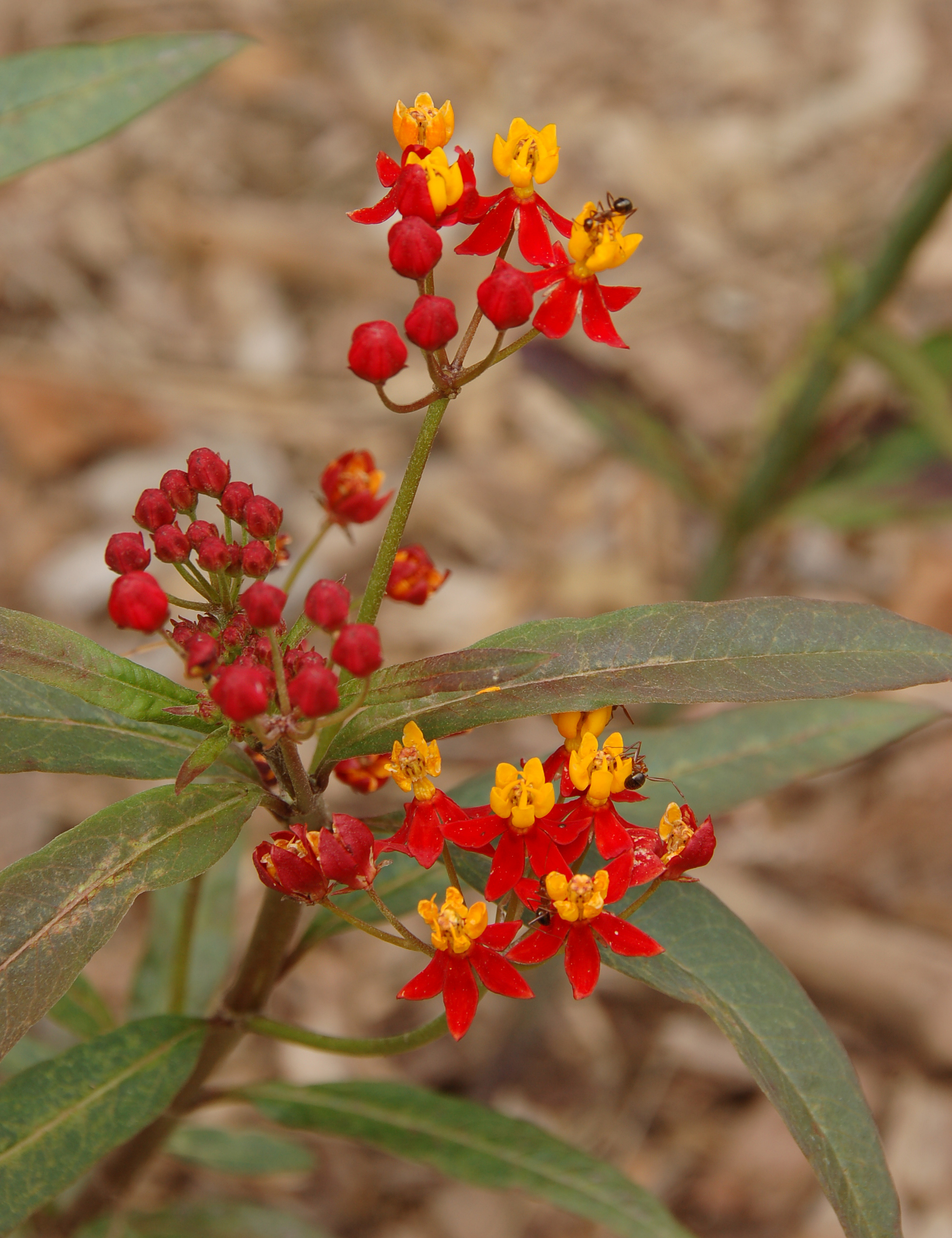
Flowers with ants feeding on the nectar

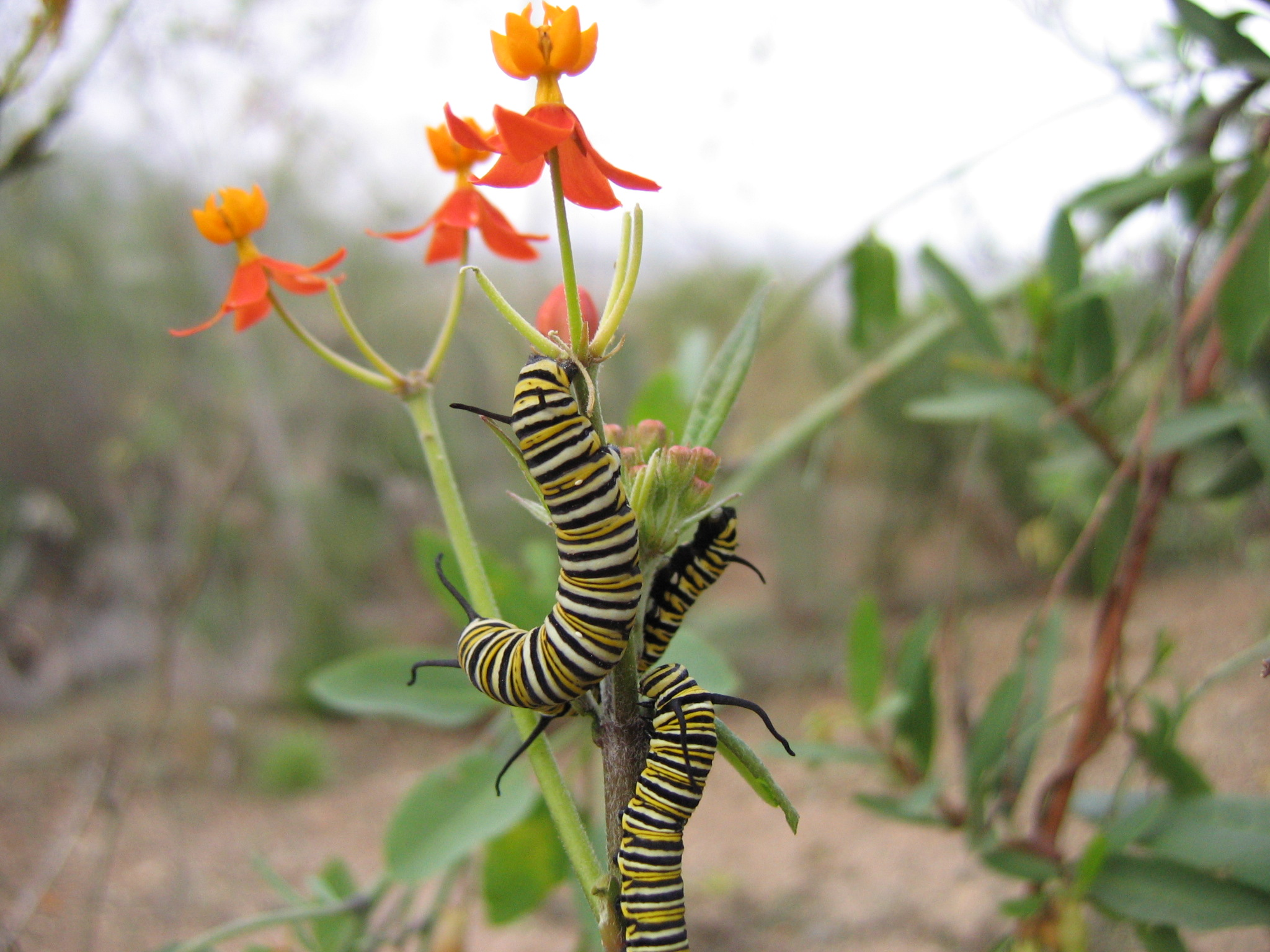
Monarch caterpillars feeding on milkweed.

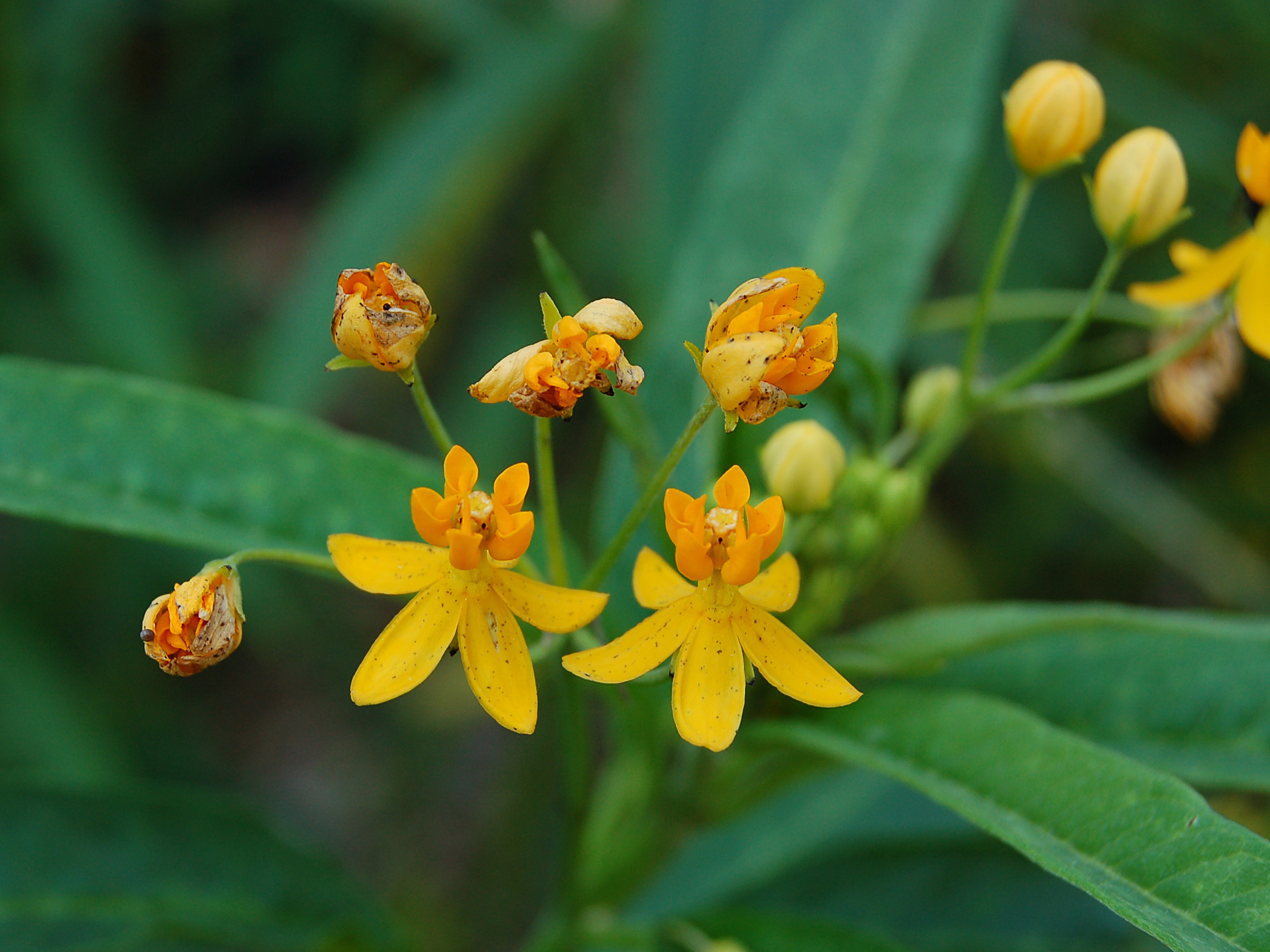
Asclepias curassavica 'Silky Gold'

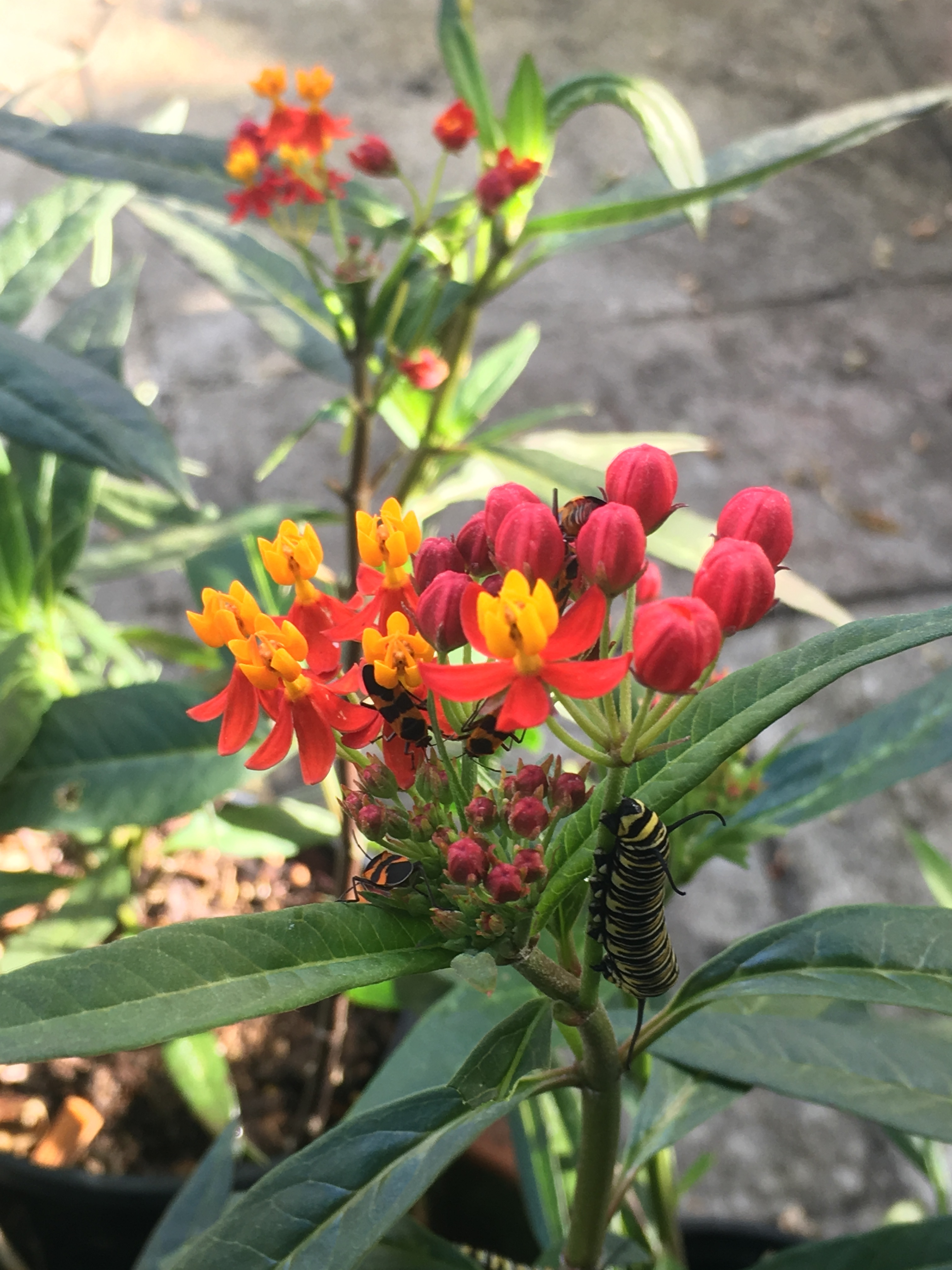
Scarlet milkweed with a Monarch caterpillar and large milkweed bugs

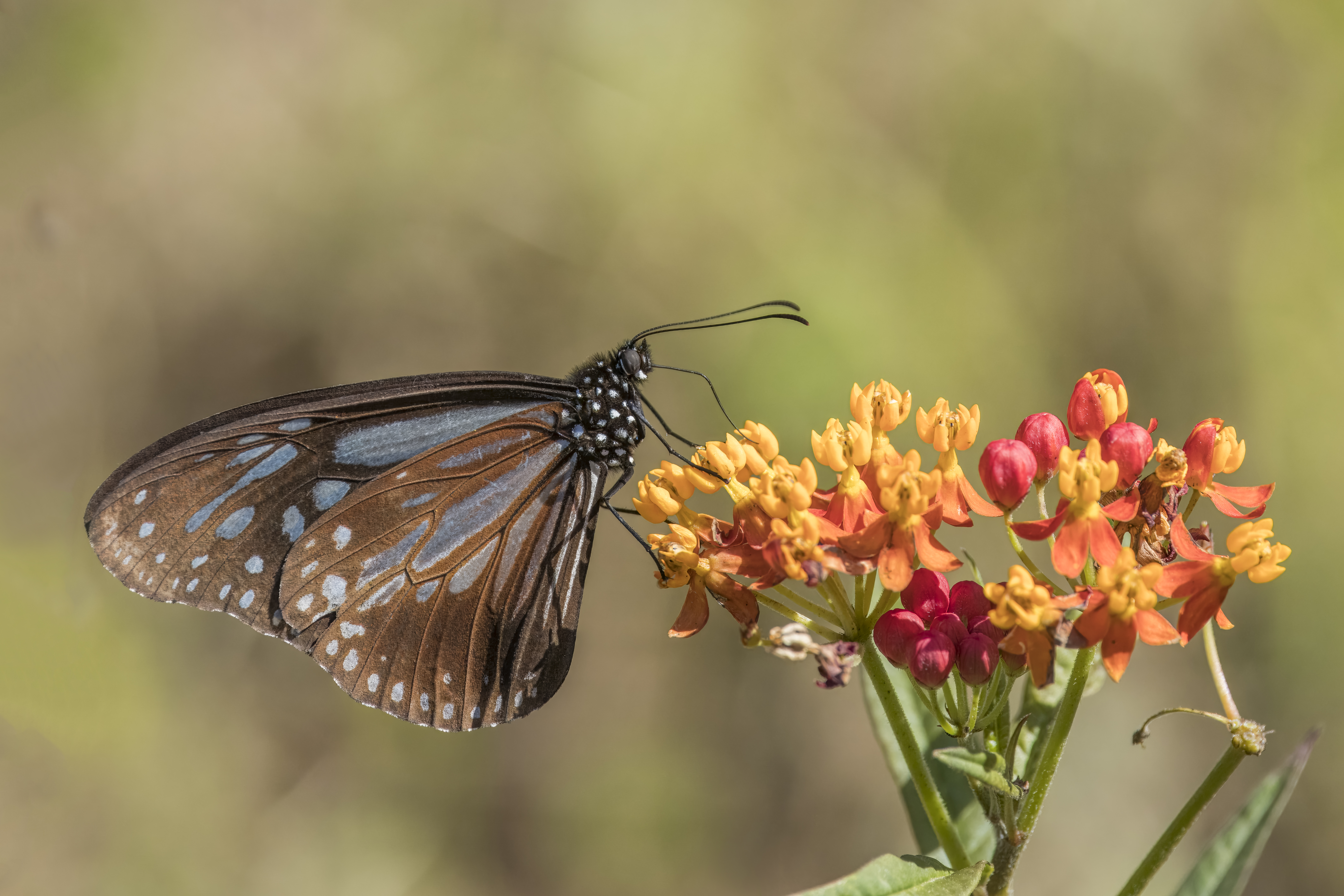
Swinhoe's chocolate tiger (Parantica swinhoei)
