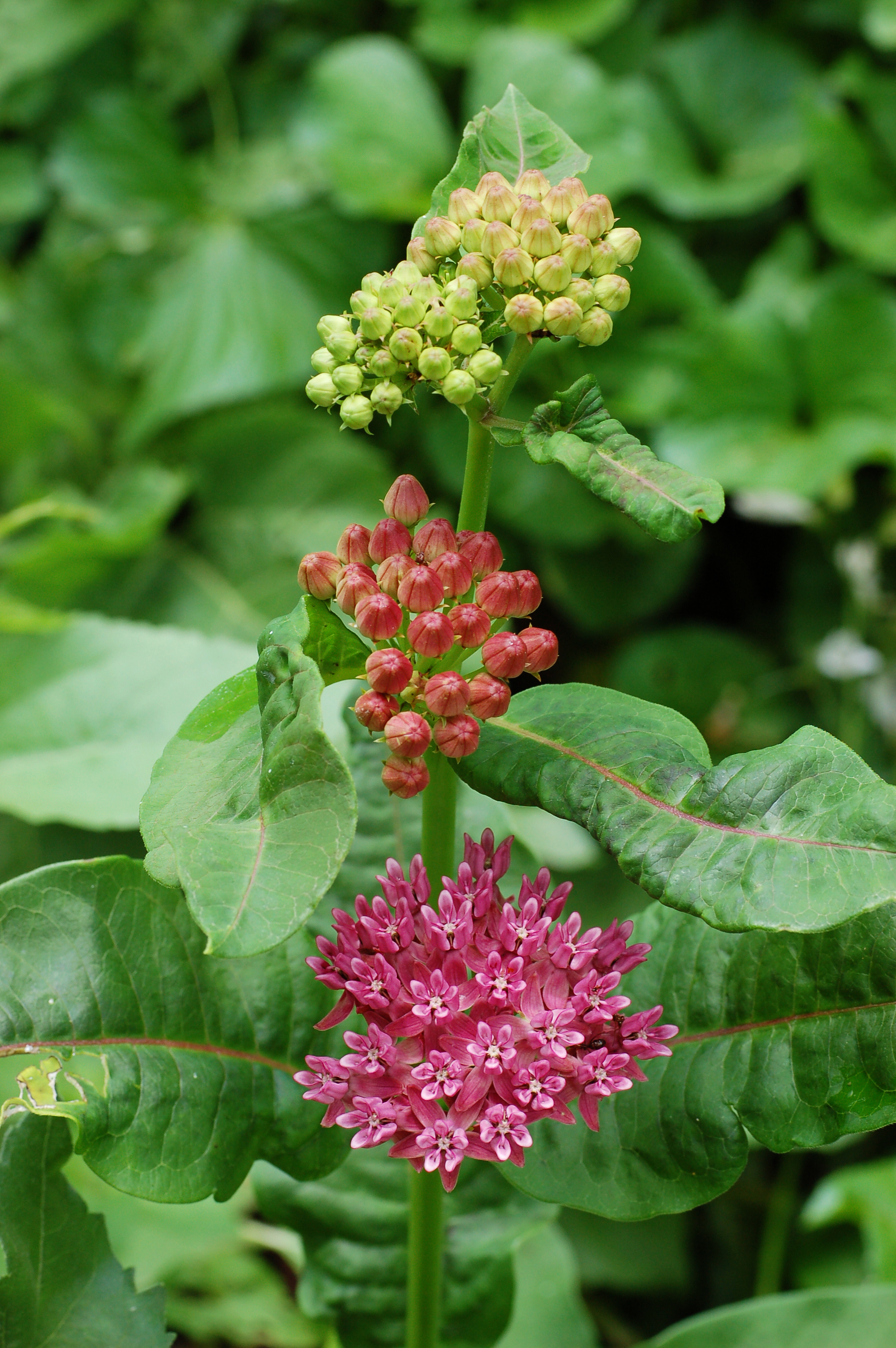

Conservation status
- Apparently Secure (NatureServe)

Scientific classification
- Kingdom: Plantae
- Clade: Tracheophytes
- Clade: Angiosperms
- Clade: Eudicots
- Clade: Asterids
- Order: Gentianales
- Family: Apocynaceae
- Genus: Asclepias
- Species: A. purpurascens

Binomial name
- Asclepias purpurascens L.

= Asclepias purpurascens =

Purple milkweed

Species of flowering plant

Asclepias purpurascens, or the purple milkweed, is a herbaceous plant species. It is in the genus Asclepias, making it a type of milkweed. It is native to the Eastern, Southern and Midwestern United States similar to the range of the common milkweed (Asclepias syriaca). The plant gets its name from the flowers that first develop a pink color but then turn darker purple as they mature. Unlike common milkweed, purple milkweed prefers some shade and is considered a plant of partial shade. It is also considered an indicator of oak savanna, especially in Wisconsin. The species rarely produces seed pods which are smooth, instead of the rough warty ones produced by common milkweed.

== Conservation status in the United States ==
It is listed endangered in Massachusetts and Wisconsin, officially as historical to Rhode Island (though with two recently discovered yet meager populations), as imperiled in Maryland and as a special concern species in Connecticut and Tennessee.

== Uses ==
Like other members of the milkweeds, several insects live off the plant, including the monarch butterfly (Danaus plexippus), the milkweed beetle (Tetraopes tetraophtalmus), large milkweed bug (Oncopeltus fasciatus), small milkweed bug (Lygaeus kalmii) and milkweed leaf beetle (Labidomera clivicollis). Other insects and pollinators feed off the flower's nectar.

This species is sometimes cultivated in gardens designed to attract butterflies, but is less common than the light purple swamp milkweed (Asclepias incarnata) or the orange butterfly weed (Asclepias tuberosa). The nectar of the plant attracts many other species of butterflies and insects.

== Gallery ==
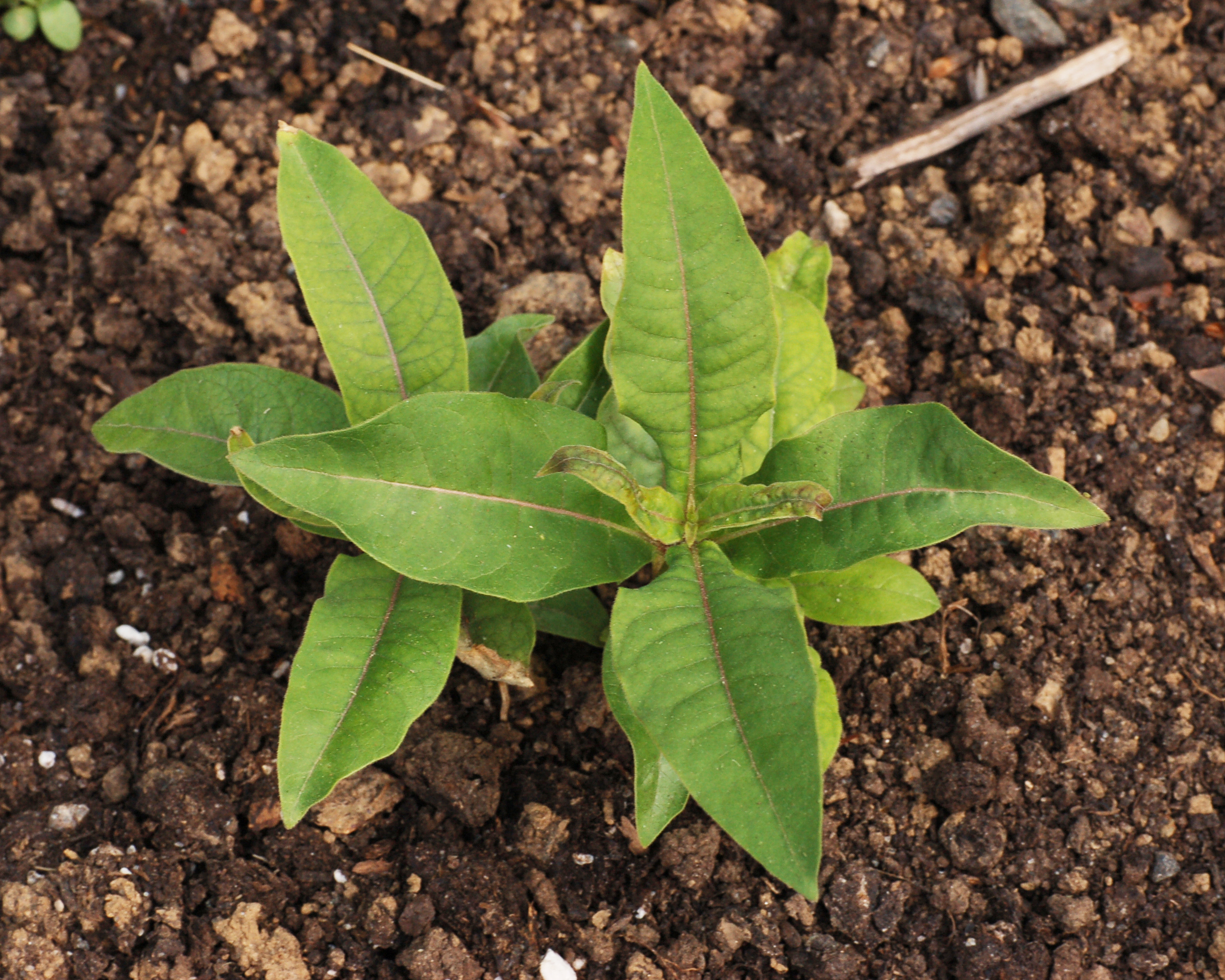
Young developing plants show foliage reminiscent of Asclepias syriaca.

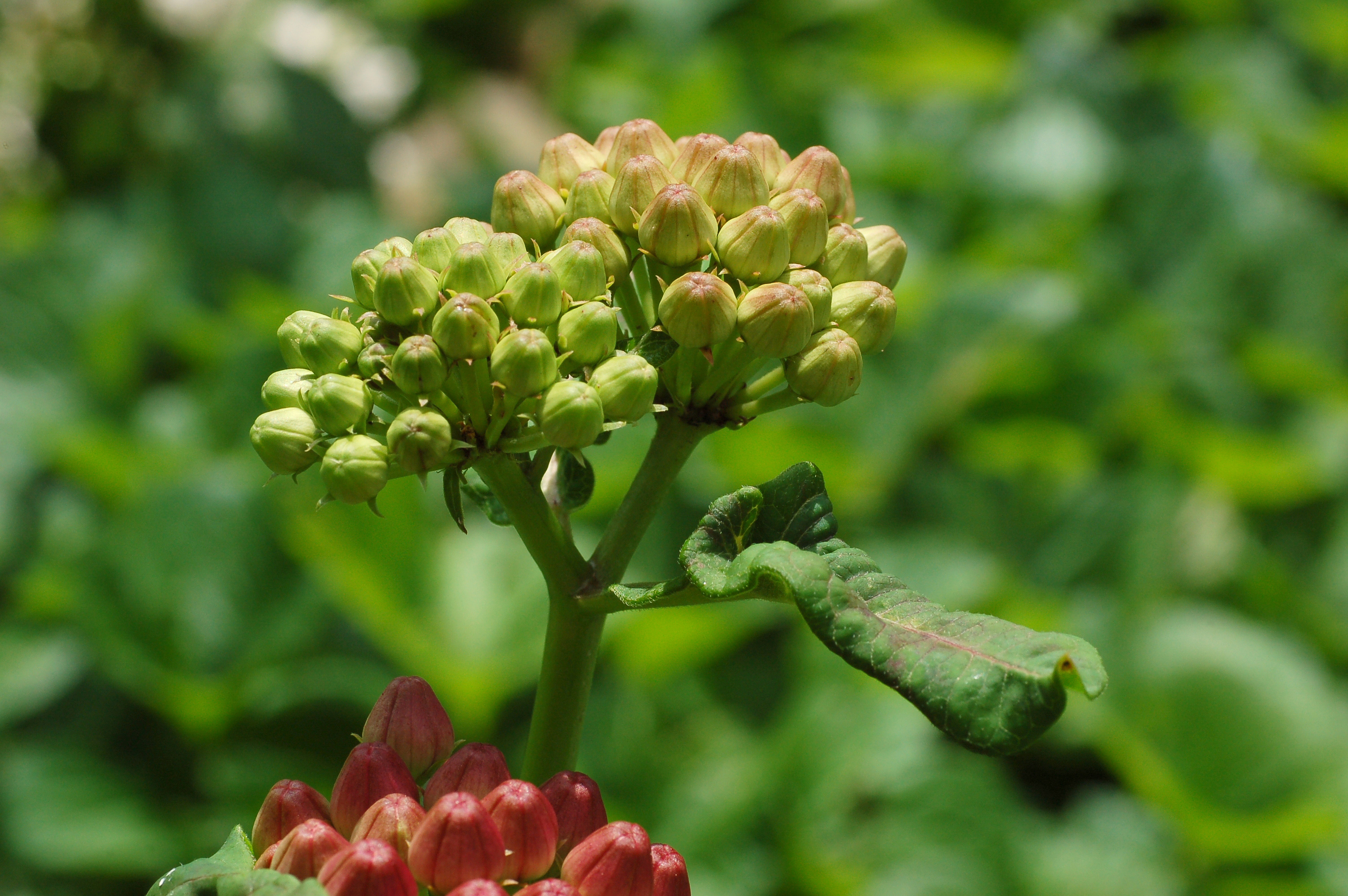
Undeveloped flower buds are light green.

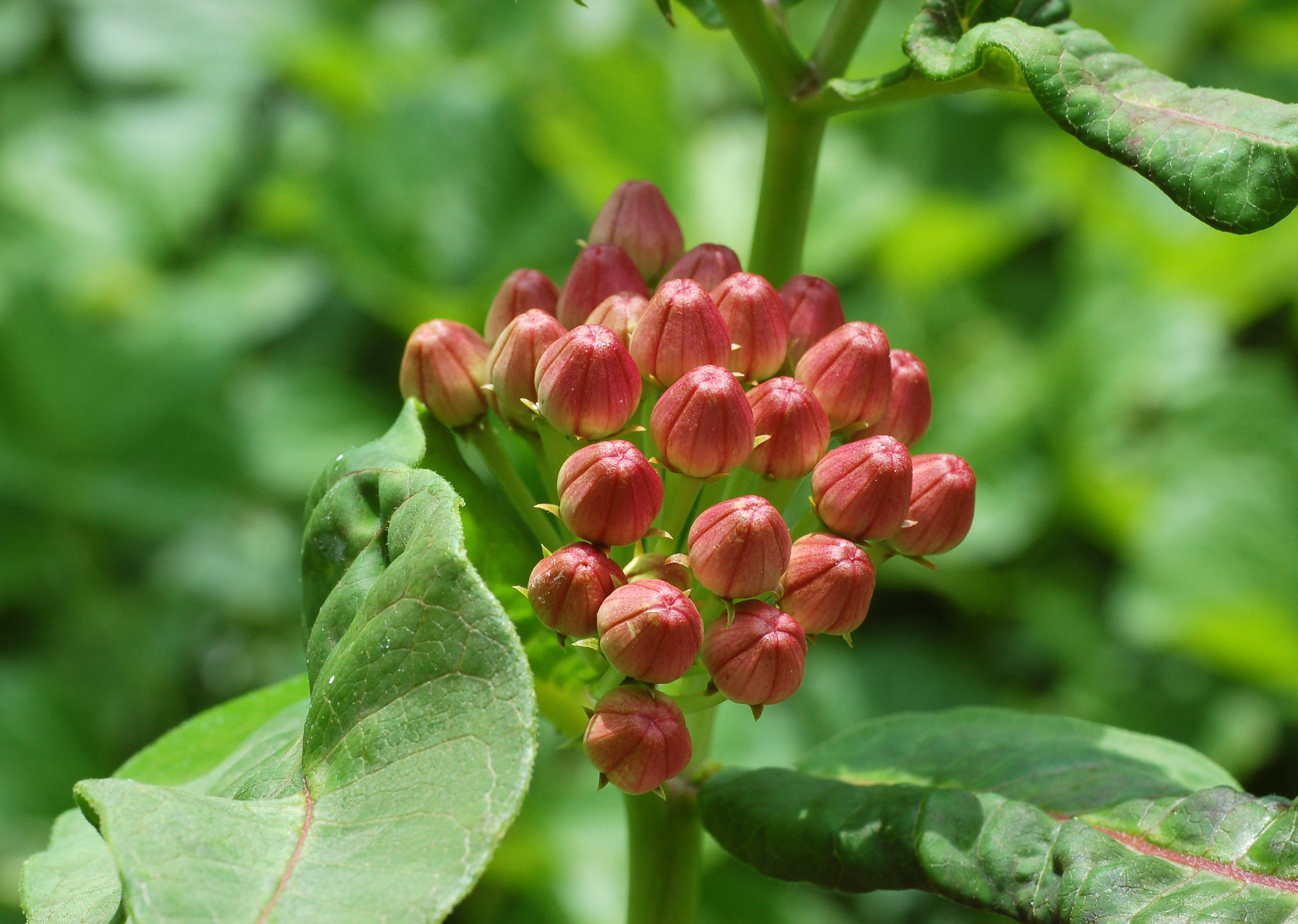
Flower buds turn pink before opening

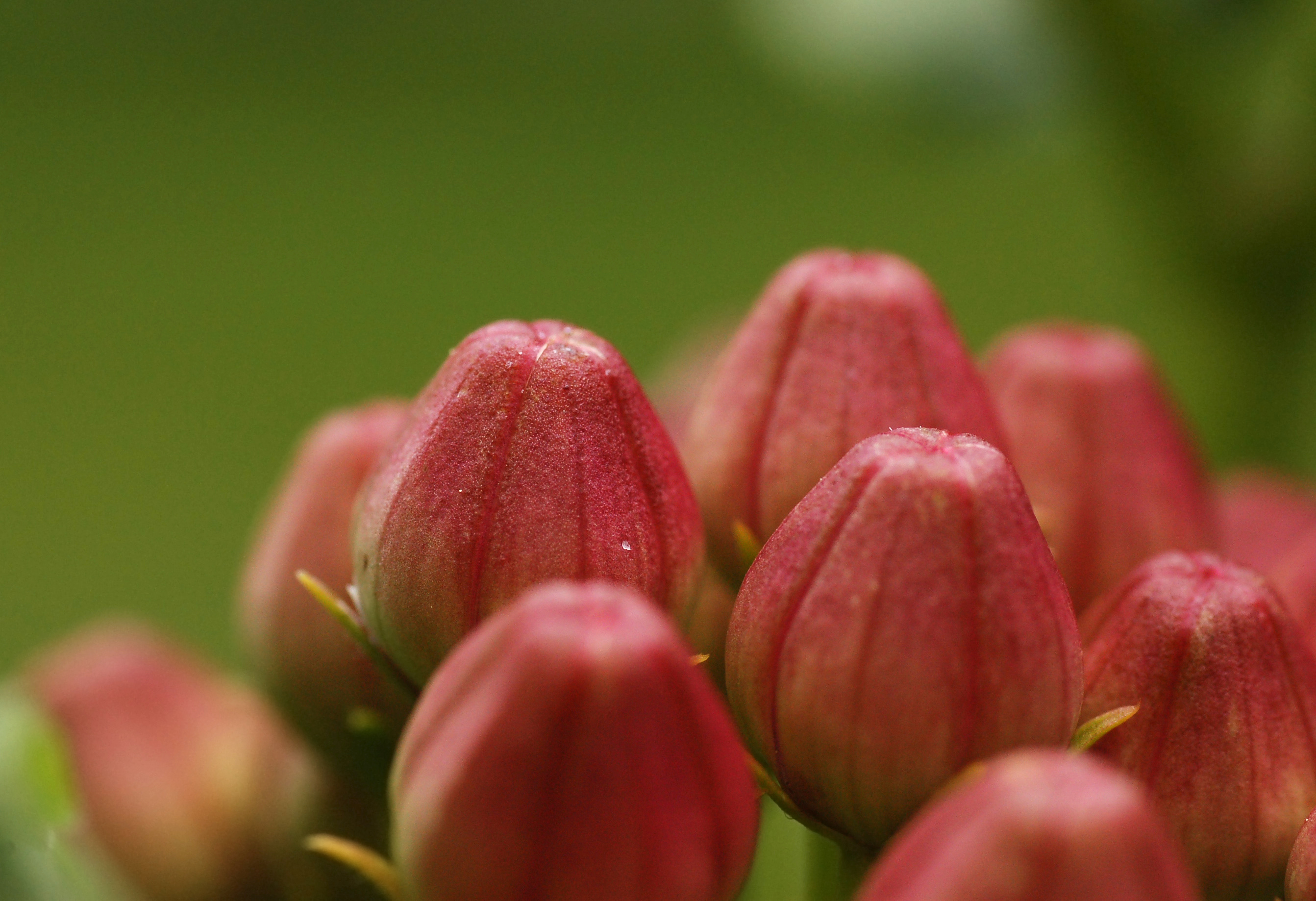
Closeup of an unopened flower

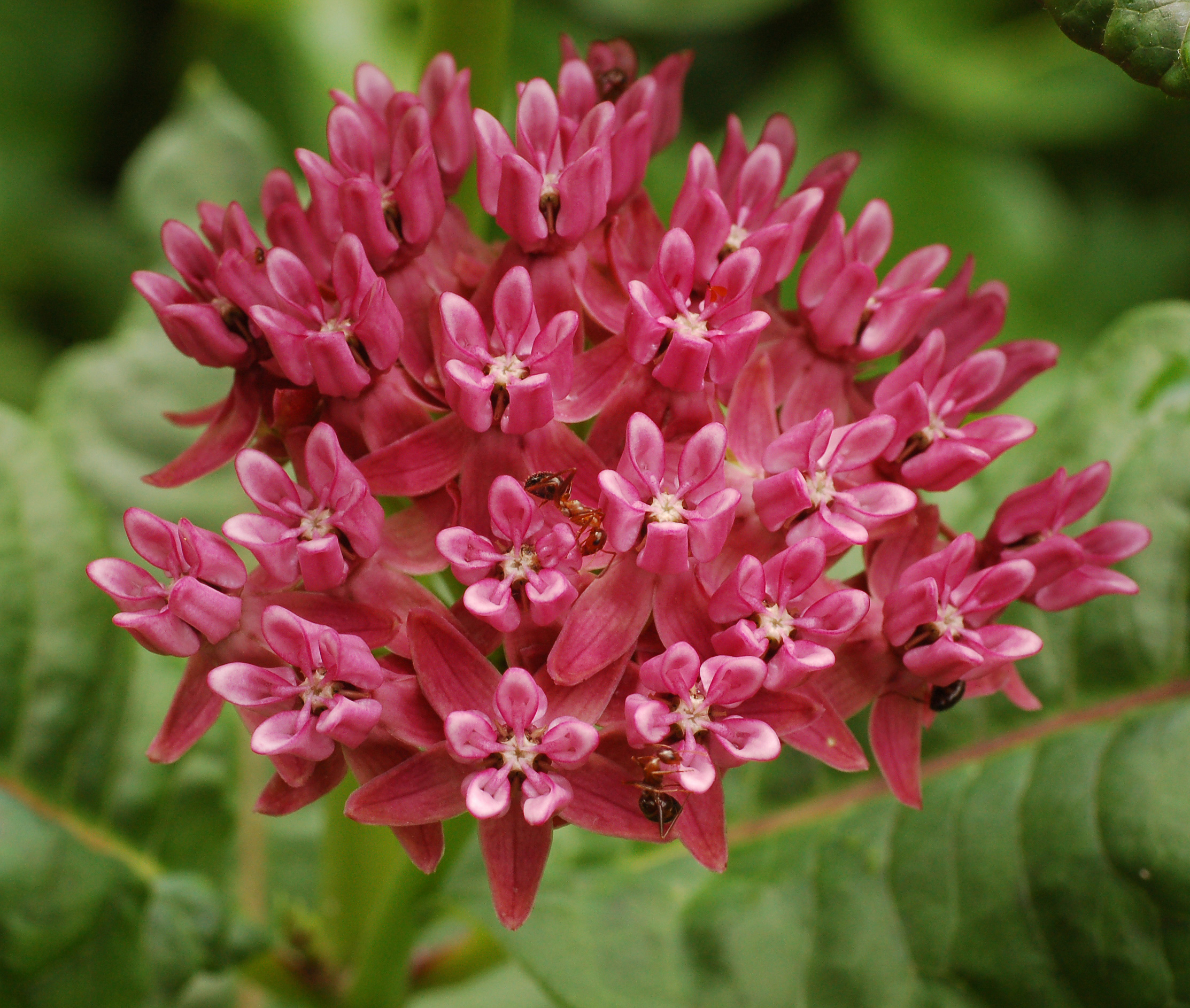
A newly bloomed flower head

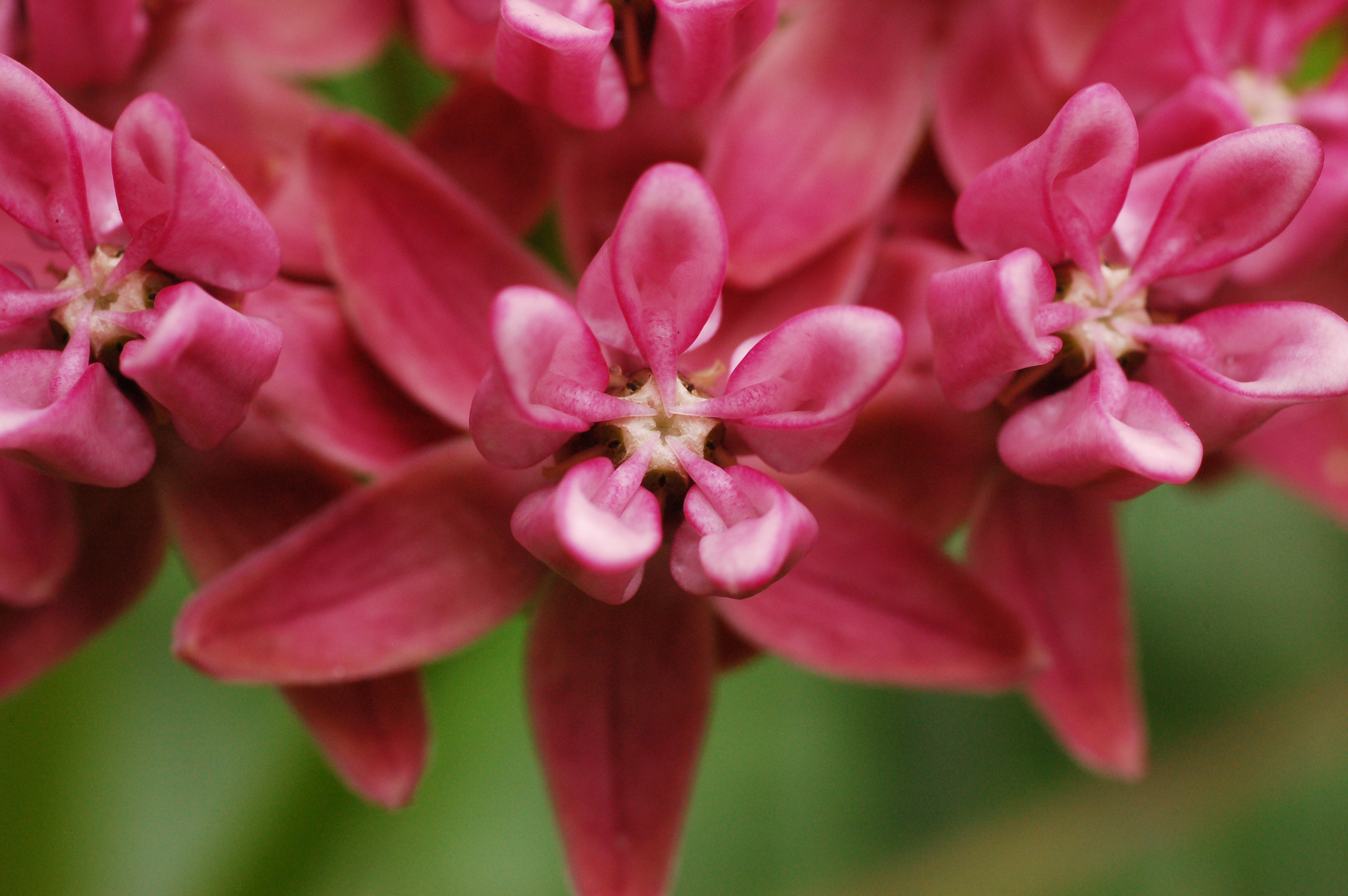
Flower closeup from the top

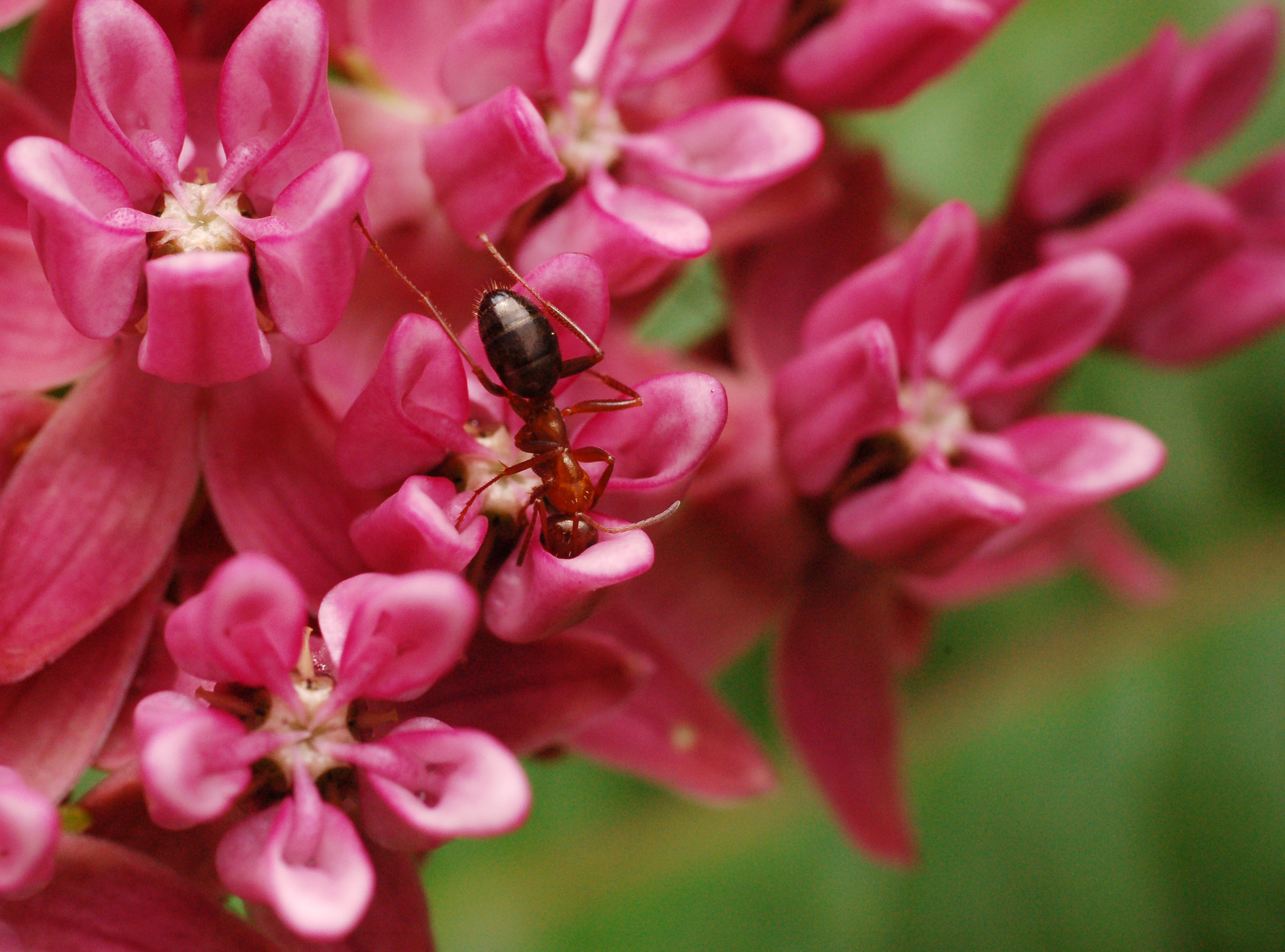
A red ant feeding on the flower's nectar

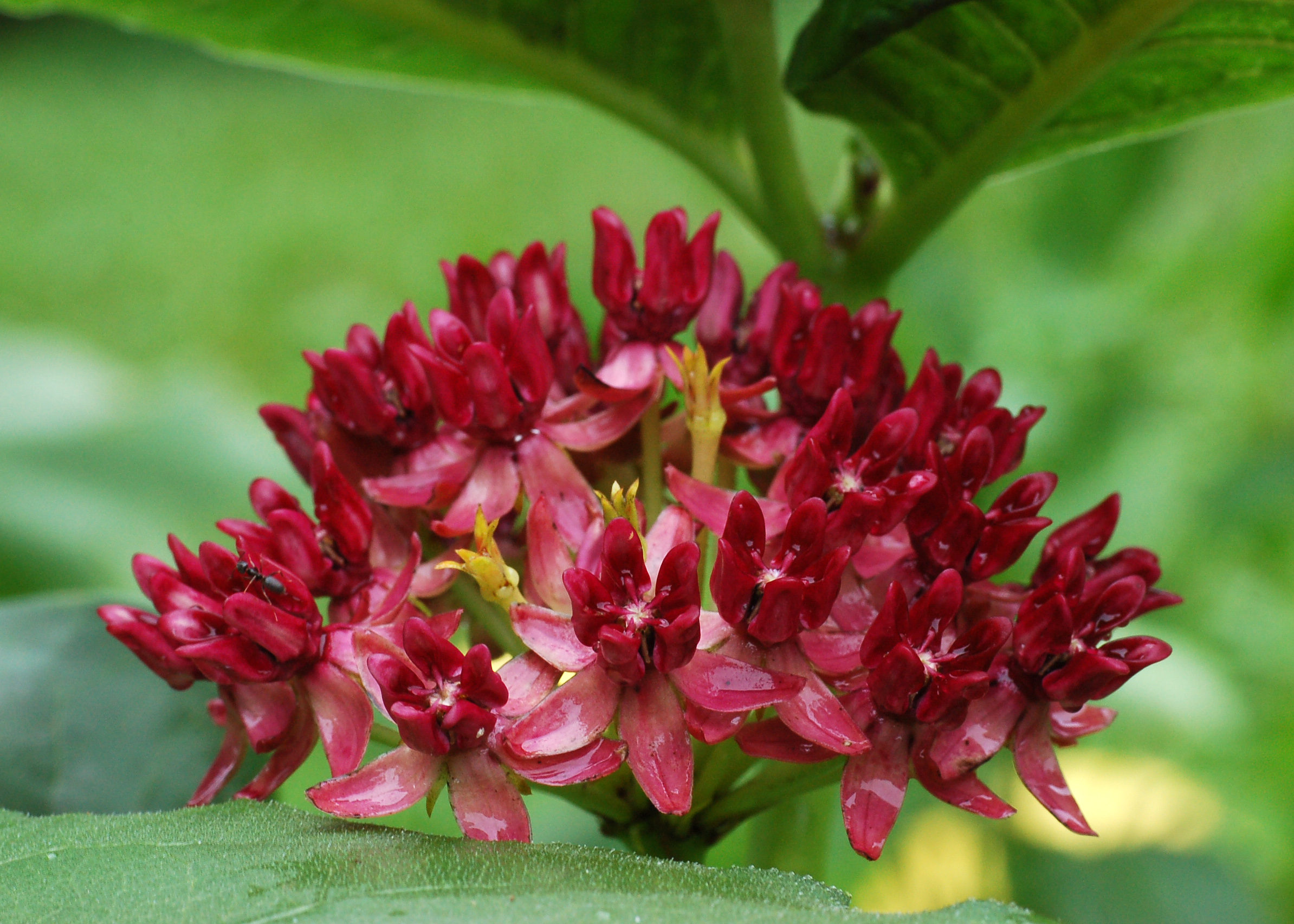
Mature flowers are darker purple.

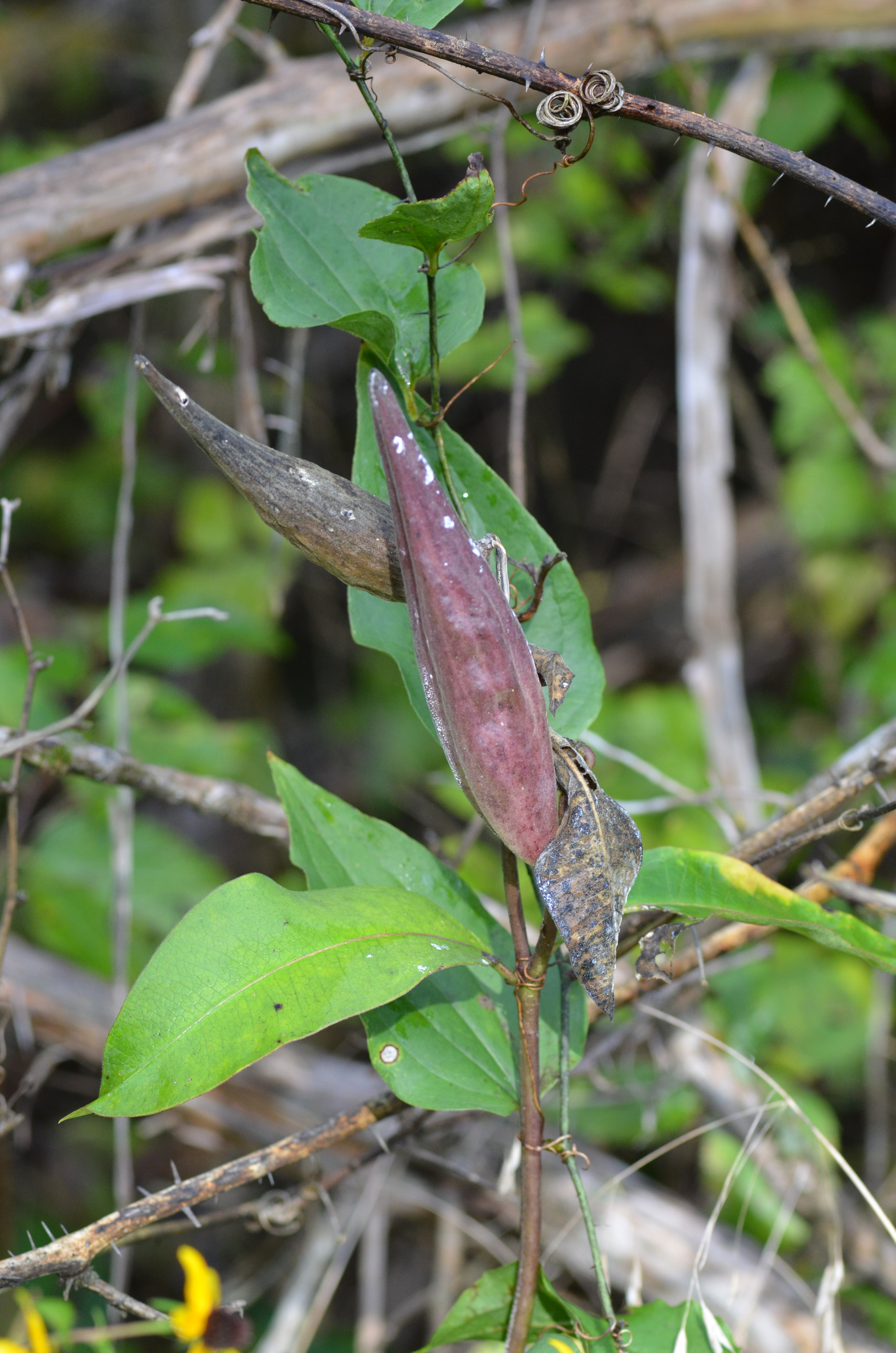
Purple milkweed pod

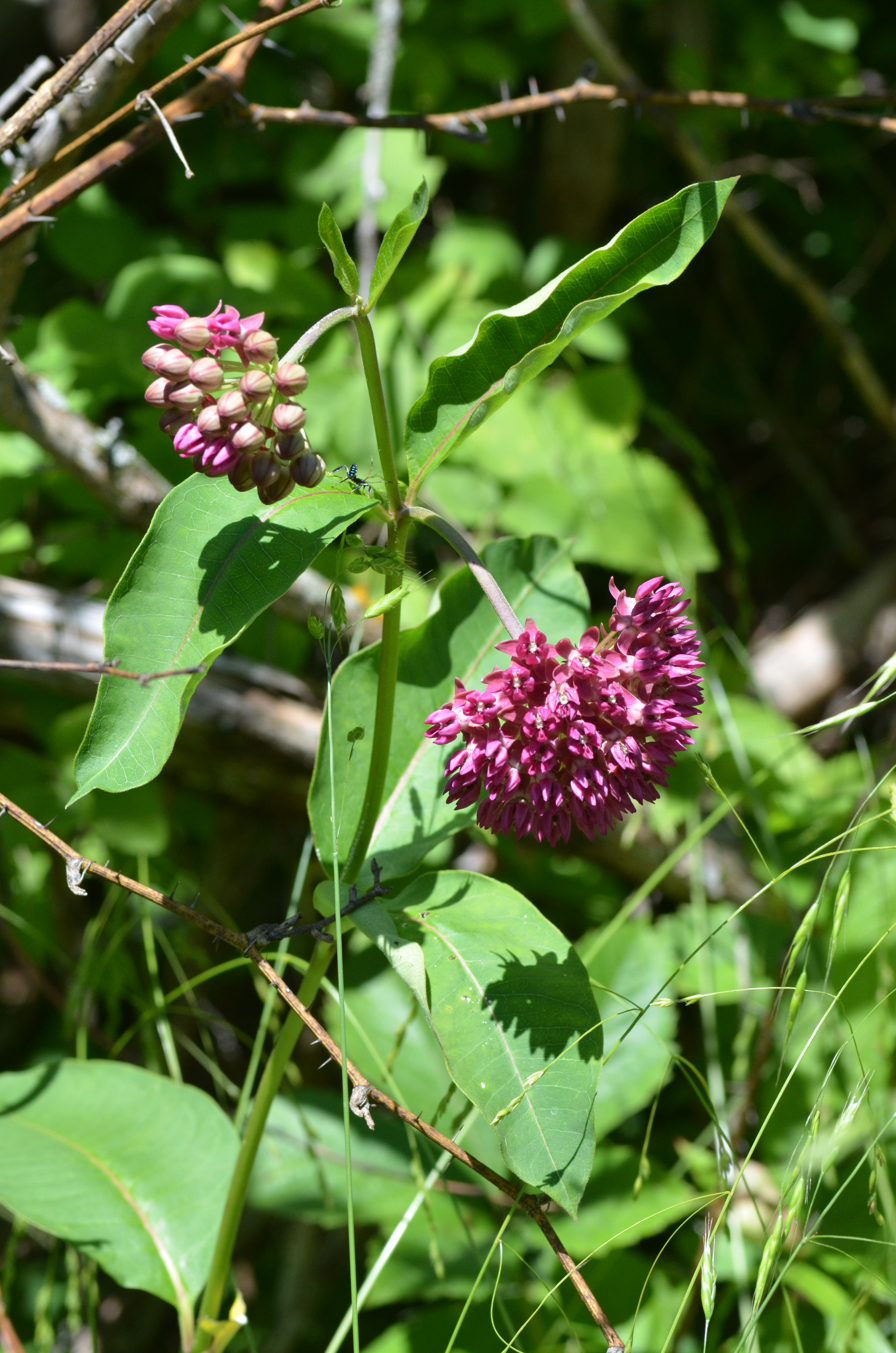
Same purple milkweed plant that produced pod in flower

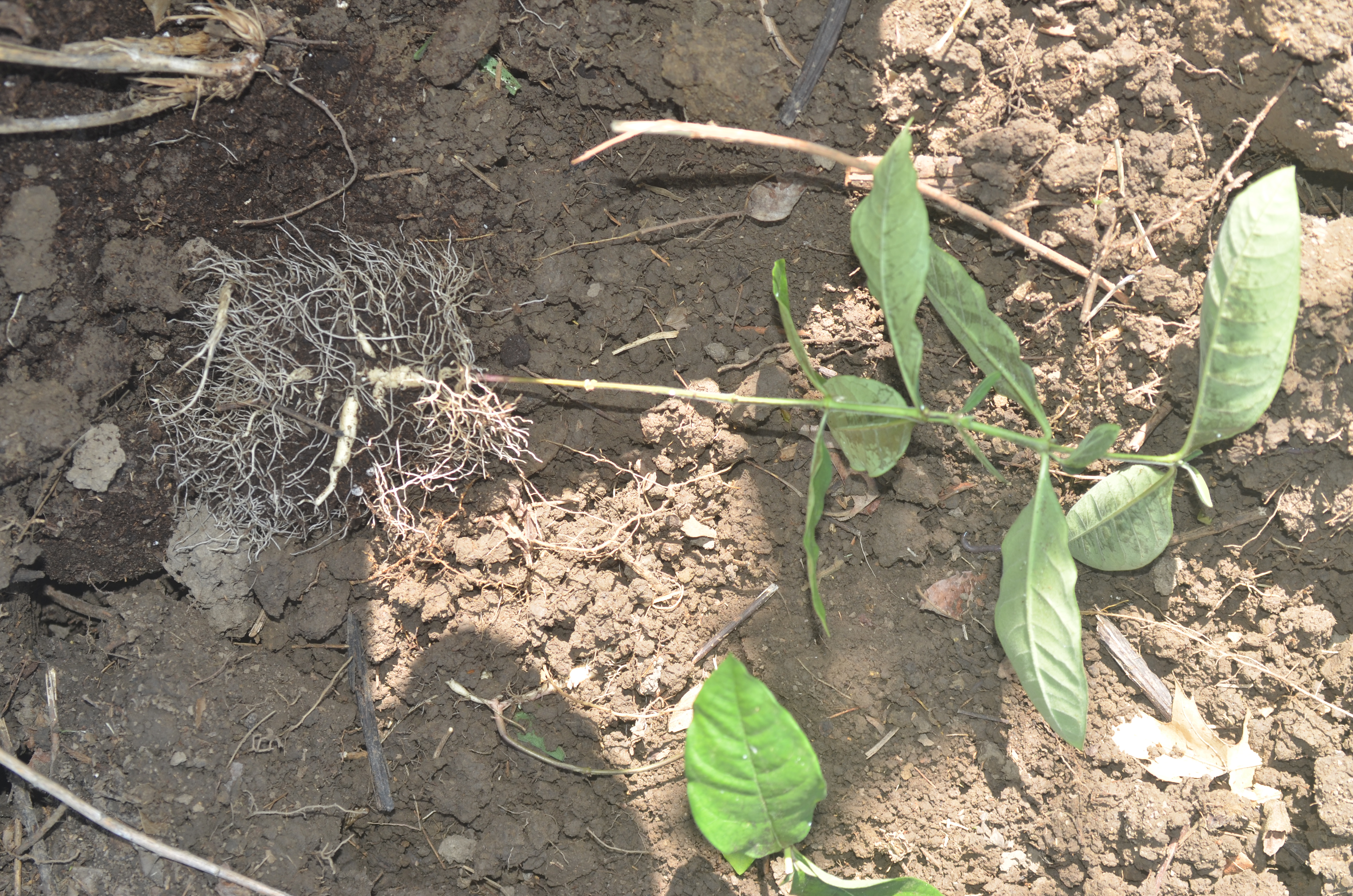
Root system of pot grown purple milkweed
