= Honey production in Hungary =

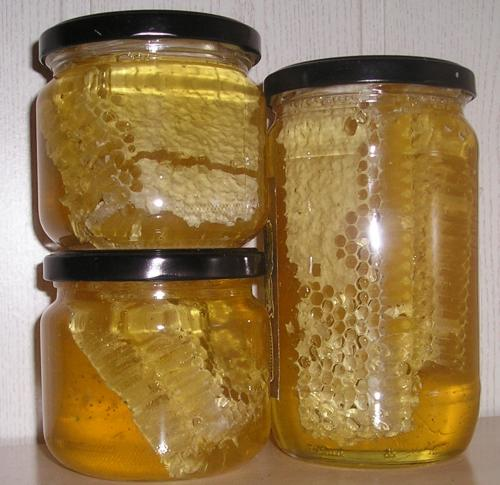
Honey production in Hungary.

Honey production in Hungary plays an important role in food supply and also in terms of local industry within the country. Hungary is one of the European Union's largest producers of natural honey, amounting to 19.7 thousand tonnes of production in 2005.

The country as a whole has around 15,000 beekeepers, which mainly export honey to the wider continent, however 5 thousand tonnes of the country's natural honey is domestically consumed. Hungary is notable for producing Robinia pseudoacacia flower honey, while other flowers pollinated include the Silkweed flower. Other Hungarian honey comes from sunflowers, and fruit trees.
