= Asclepain =

Identifiers
- EC no.: 3.4.22.7
- CAS no.: 37288-80-5

Databases
- IntEnz: IntEnz view
- BRENDA: BRENDA entry
- ExPASy: NiceZyme view
- KEGG: KEGG entry
- MetaCyc: metabolic pathway
- PRIAM: profile
- PDB structures: RCSB PDB PDBe PDBsum
Search
- PMC: articles
- PubMed: articles
- NCBI: proteins

Asclepain (EC 3.4.22.7) is an enzyme. This enzyme catalyses the following chemical reaction

Similar to that of papain

This enzyme is isolated from the latex of milkweed, Asclepias syriaca.
