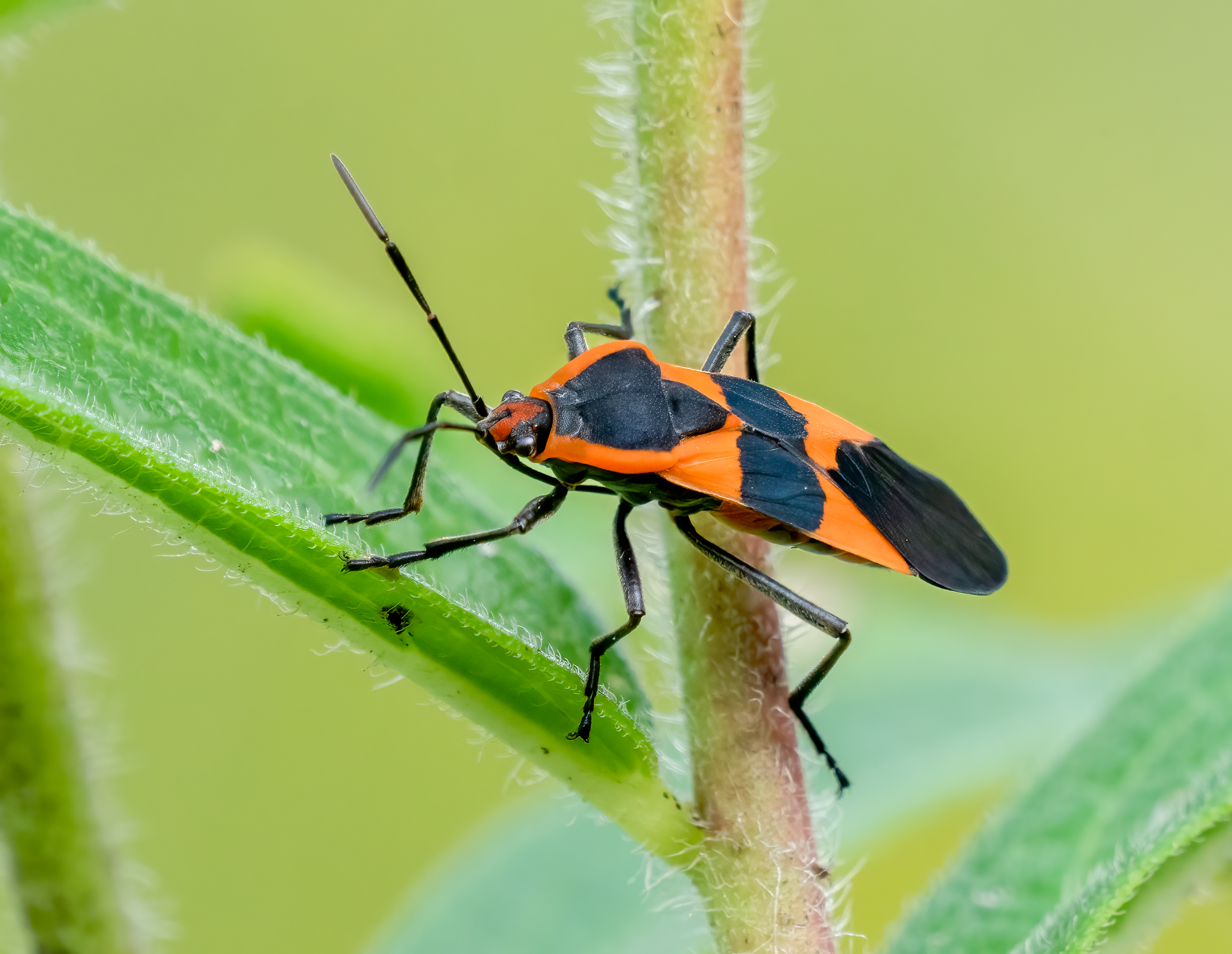

Scientific classification
- Kingdom: Animalia
- Phylum: Arthropoda
- Clade: Pancrustacea
- Class: Insecta
- Order: Hemiptera
- Suborder: Heteroptera
- Family: Lygaeidae
- Genus: Oncopeltus
- Species: O. fasciatus

Binomial name
- Oncopeltus fasciatus (Dallas, 1852)

= Large milkweed bug =

Species of true bug

Oncopeltus fasciatus, known as the large milkweed bug, is a medium-sized hemipteran (true bug) of the family Lygaeidae. It is distributed throughout North America, from Central America through Mexico and the Caribbean to southern areas in Canada. Costa Rica is the southern limit of its range. It inhabits disturbed areas, roadsides, and open pastures. Due to this widespread geographic distribution, the large milkweed bug exhibits varying life history trade-offs depending on the population location, including differences in wing length and other traits based on location.

== Identification ==
Adults can range from 11 to 12 mm in length and have a red/orange and black X-shaped pattern on their wings underneath the triangle that is typical to hemipterans. This feature makes the bug easily seen, acting as an aposematic warning to predators. O. fasciatus exhibits Müllerian mimicry and is noxious to predators. The ventral side of the fourth abdominal segment bears a black band in the male and two black spots in the female. Juveniles are born mostly red with black antennae and a few black spots, throughout growth the black spots are developed as well as wing pads. The eggs are bright orange and easily detectable.

== Life cycle ==
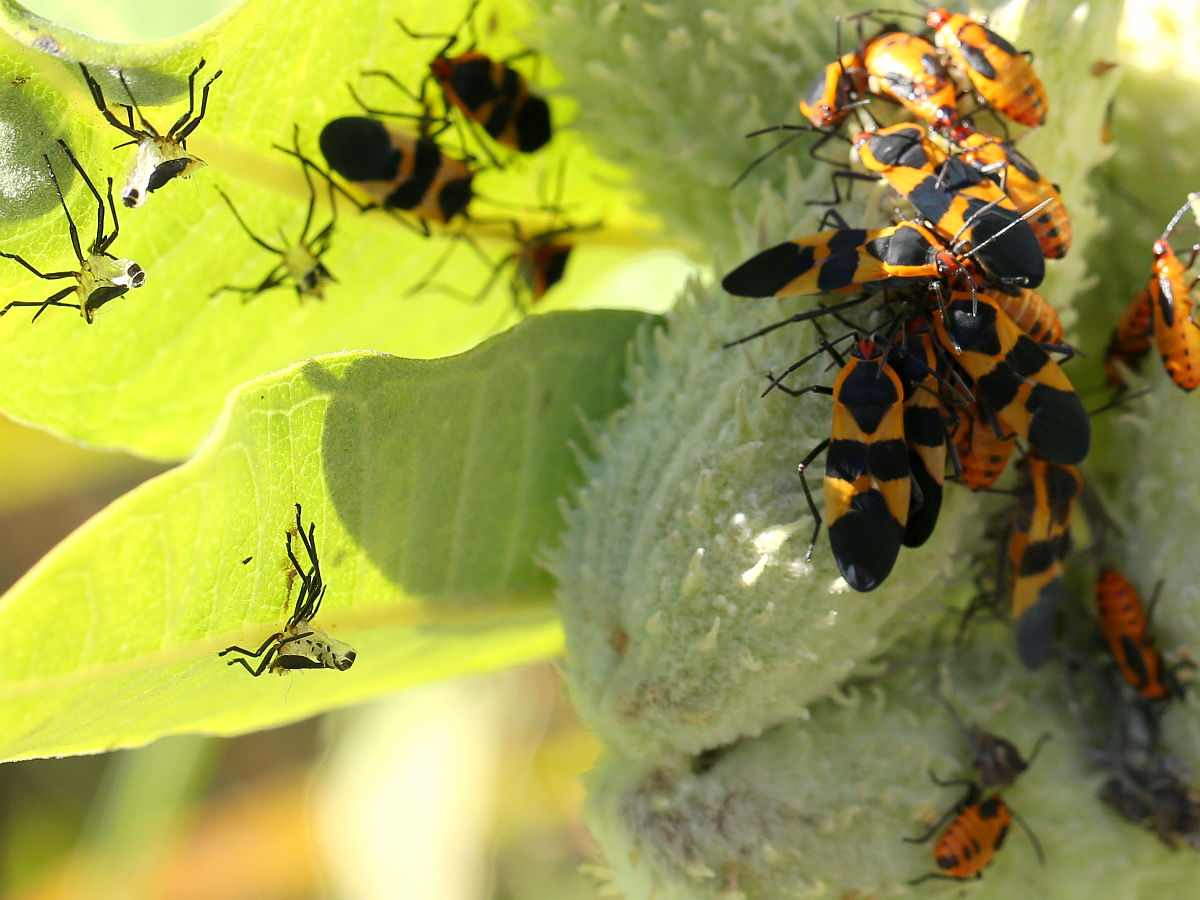
The exuviae from a molt may seem like ghost insects. Russell R. Kirt Prairie, Illinois

A large milkweed bug molting from third to fourth instar, showing scenes of the molting followed by the entire molt at fifteen times speed. The last is a superposition of the stage before to just after the molt, showing significantly increased size in a short time.

The large milkweed bug is a hemimetabolous insect, meaning it grows in stages called instars and goes through incomplete metamorphosis, exhibiting small changes throughout development such as coloration changes, development of wings and genitalia. O. fasciatus begins as an egg and experiences four nymphal stages over 28–30 days before moulting to adulthood. Females become sexually receptive within a few days of adulthood. Geographic location has a large effect on egg production rate and clutch size, although the intrinsic increase in reproduction depends on the climate to which the individual is acclimated. For example, two close populations (60 km apart) residing on a sharp incline have differing optimal reproduction temperatures, where the cooler (higher) adapted population is at 23 °C and the warmer (lower) population is adapted to 27 °C. The highest clutch size occurs in Puerto Rico, Florida, and Texas populations at 30–50 eggs per clutch. The lowest clutch size was found in California at 25–30 eggs per clutch. Northern populations in Iowa and Maryland exhibited a clutch size in between the two extremes, from 25 to 35 eggs per clutch.

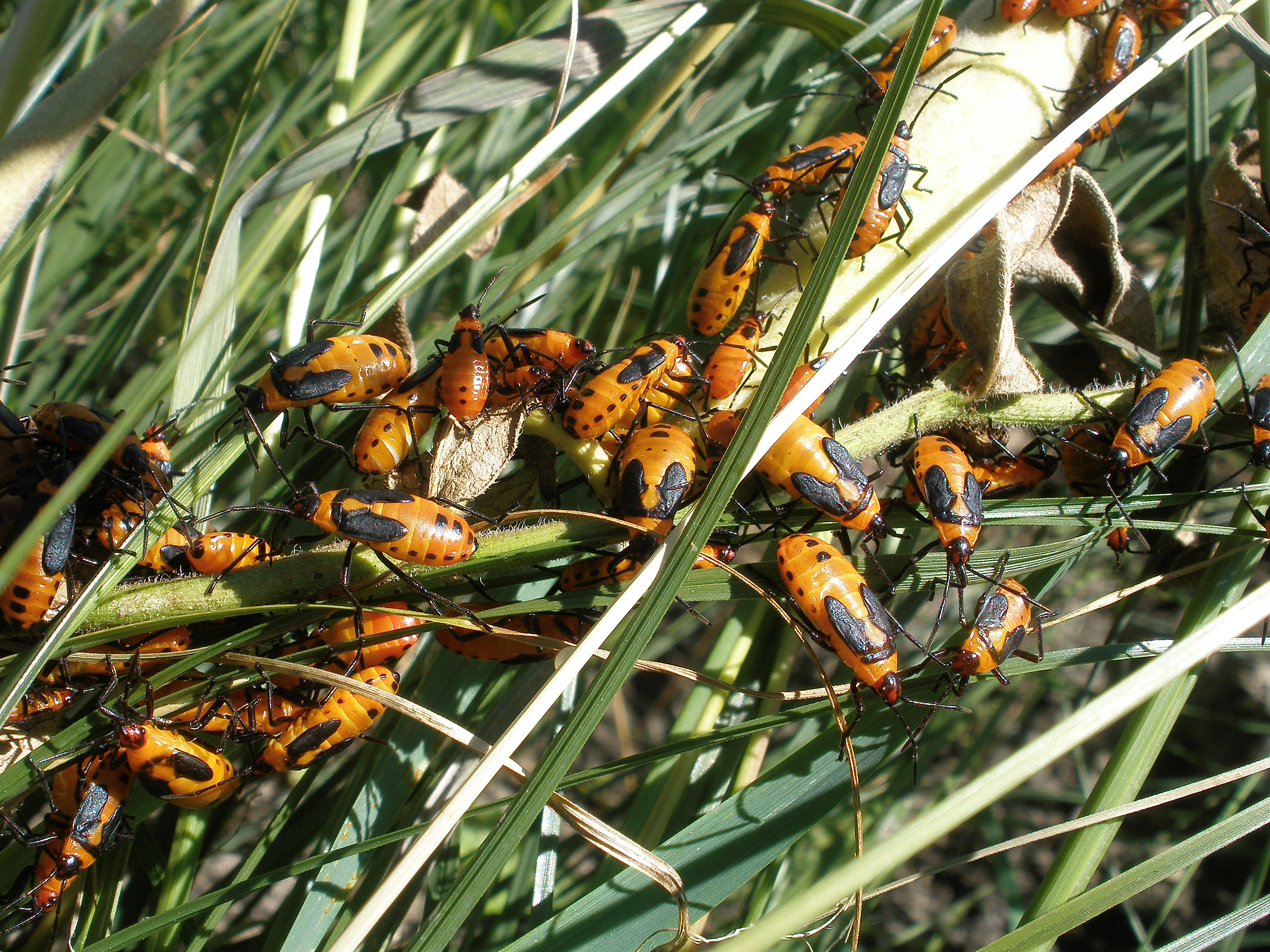
O. fasciatus

In favourable conditions (the tropics) reproduction occurs continuously all year round, while in less-favourable conditions (temperate zones) reproduction occurs during the warmer months. Reproducing when migrants arrive introduces gene flow between northern and southern populations, which provides an advantage to midrange populations (variable climates) because females then can ensure genetic variability. The milkweed bug can produce from one to three generations per year depending on climate and geographic location. O. fasciatus exhibits strong selection for survival and will halt reproduction if conditions are not ideal.

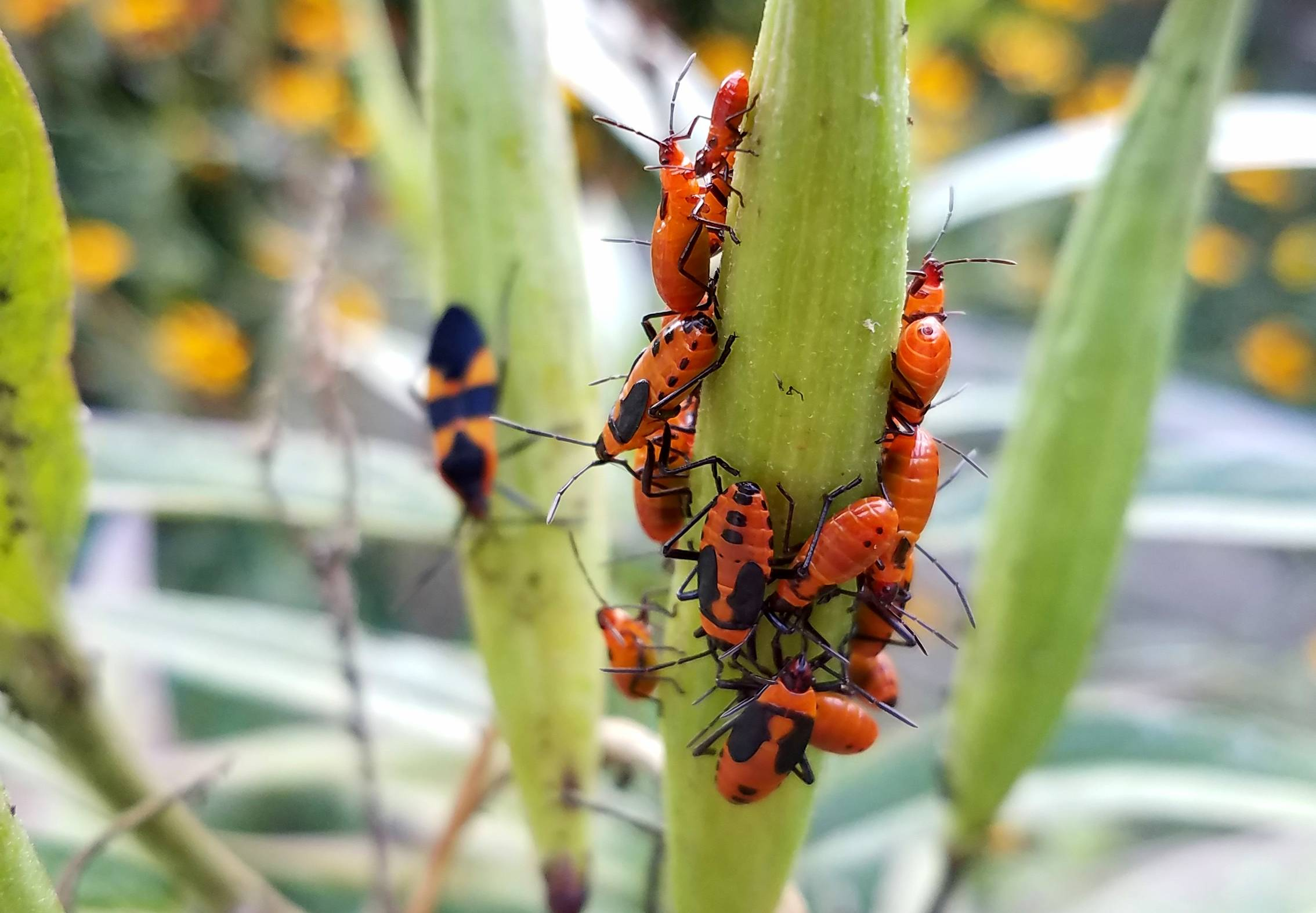
O. fasciatus

Diapause occurs on short days, cold days in temperate regions, and occasionally during dry season in tropical regions. Most populations of the milkweed bug overwinter, usually after migration to their overwintering sites due to environmental triggers such as temperature and photoperiod. However, photoperiod only predicts overwintering in areas where day length affects the maturation of milkweed. Therefore, no overwintering occurs in tropical regions, as it does not supply an adaptive advantage.

== Migration ==
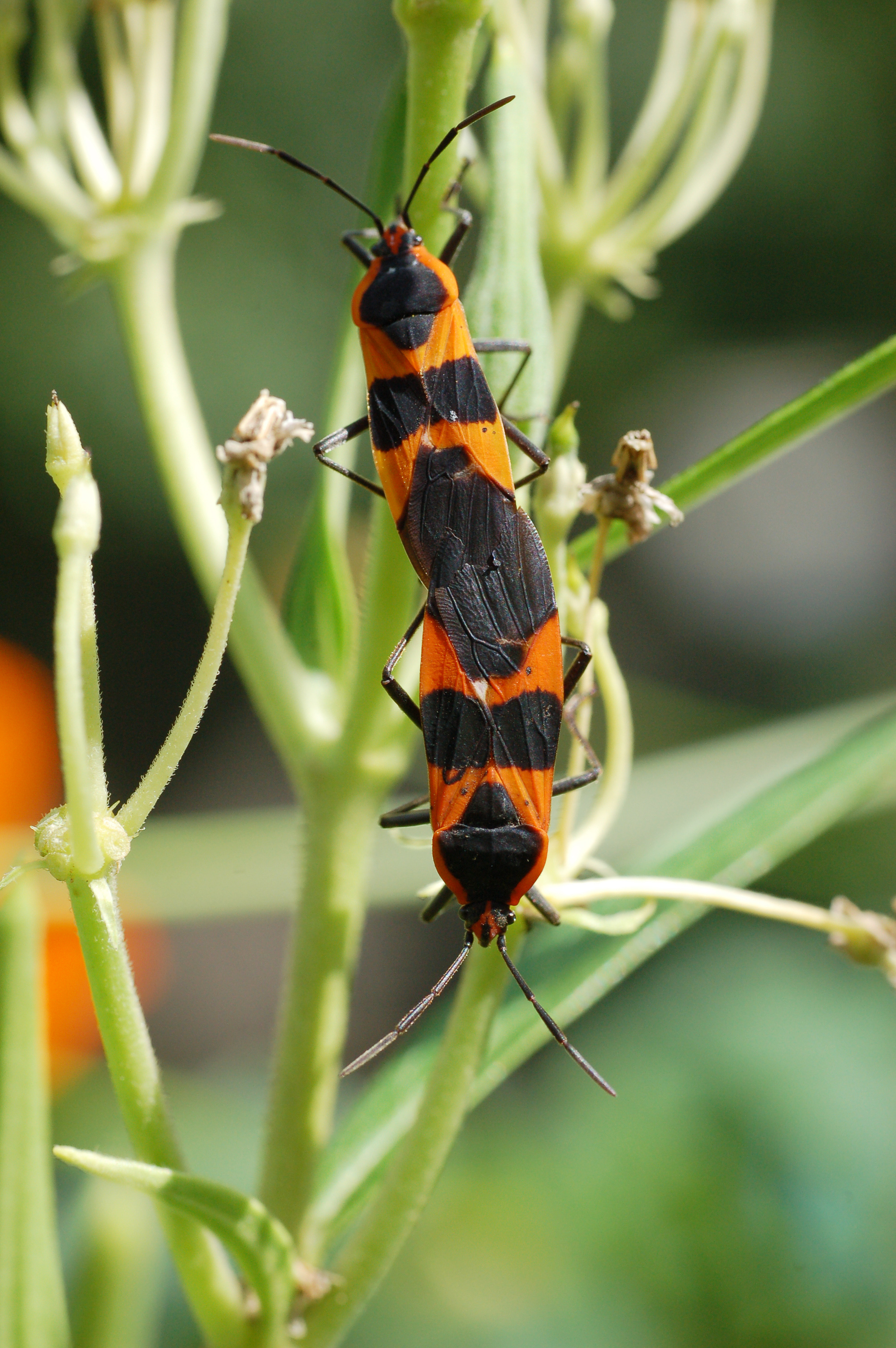
Adult O. fasciatus

A large milkweed bug nymph feeding on milkweed before extracting its stylet, sheathing it again in its rostrum

O. fasciatus populations can be separated into migrators and nonmigrators. Palmer and Dingle showed that northern populations such as those in Iowa show the greatest tendency for long-distance flight and are highly migratory. Oppositely, southern populations such as those in Puerto Rico show the lowest tendency and are sedentary. Southern populations grow seasonally as migrants appear in late spring and mid-summer. A migratory syndrome has been described in the northern population, meaning that traits such as wing length, fecundity, developmental time and flight duration are all genetically correlated with migration tendencies. Groeters and Dingle suggest that this selection is specific to the population's environment due to the small correlations between life-history strategies across geographic ranges. A trade-off between migration and life history traits may be the cause of such a wide geological distribution. Attisano suggests that genetic factors as well as environmental cues trigger migration in some individuals. Since the length of flights decreases with decreasing latitude, temperature is a strong factor influencing migration. Movement also correlates with the flowering of milkweeds which provides further evidence that environmental triggers relate to migration. Larger females are thought to allocate resources to migration simply because they have more to spare. Smaller individuals are thought to deploy alternative mechanism, one being the reabsorption of oocytes for energy. The fact that these insects return to northern environments after migration could be the influence of a genetic predisposition, selected for due to crowding and increased intraspecific competition for resources in southern areas.

Tropical populations migrate shorter distances than temperate populations because the spatial variation of their choice host (milkweed) is much greater, so it is advantageous to seek new sources of food rather than tolerate the depletion of resources.

== Diet ==
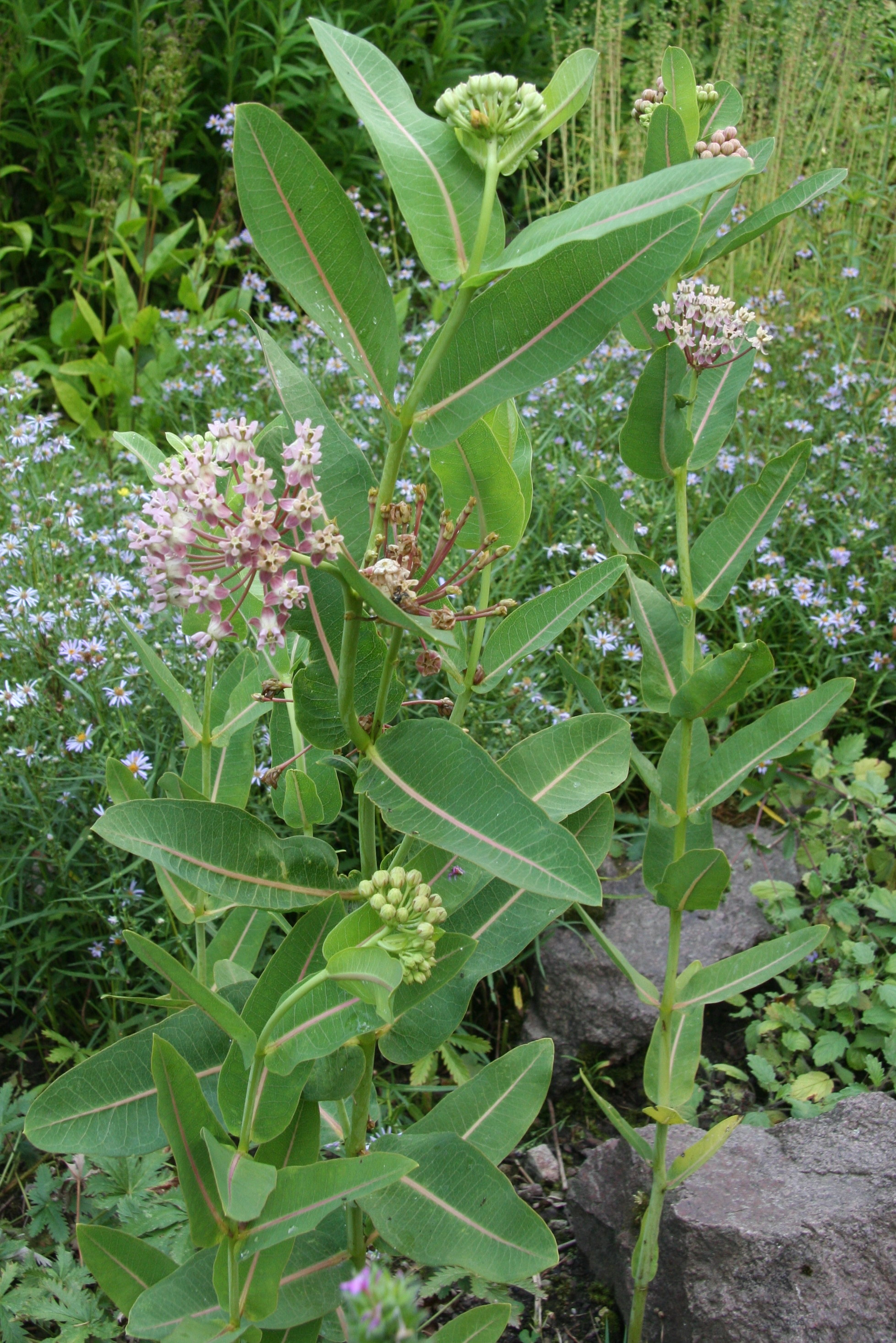
Asclepias syriaca

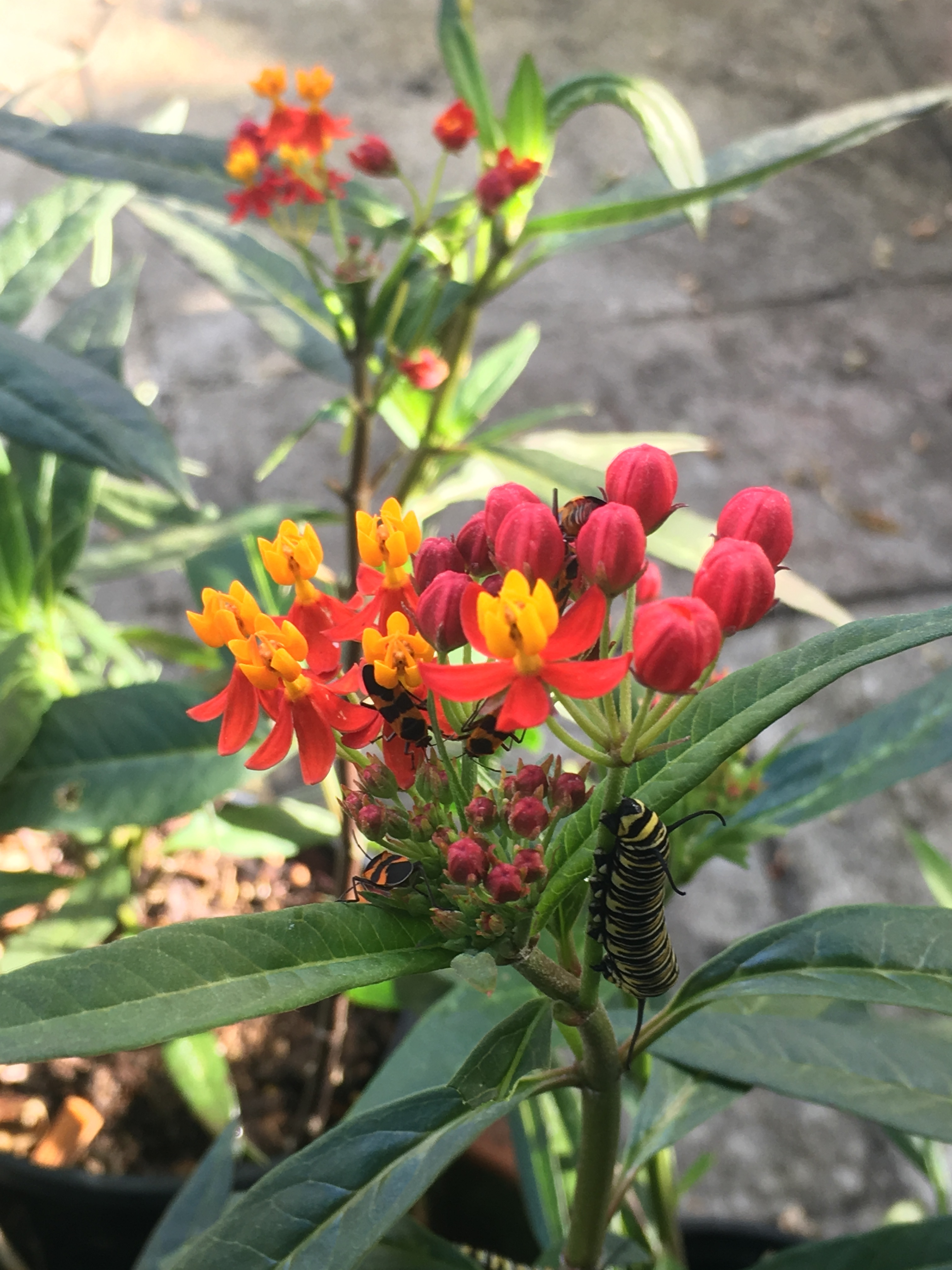
Asclepias curassavica

O. fasciatus is a specialist herbivore that frequently consumes milkweed seeds. In addition to its plant-based diet, O. fasciatus has been observed feeding on aphids, monarch caterpillar eggs, and larvae, displaying opportunistic behavior.

The large milkweed bug also feeds on A. nivea, Sarcostemma clausa, Calotropis procera, and Nerium oleander. Southern populations often consume Asclepias curassavica, a tropical milkweed. When given sunflower seeds in a laboratory, experimental insects obtained 90% of their lipids, 50% of their protein and 20% of their carbohydrates from the seeds, demonstrating that O. fasciatus is an efficient eater. Toxic compounds in milkweeds are also sequestered within the plant, which causes O. fasciatus to become toxic through consuming them.

Large milkweed bug using its rostrum on the underside of a milkweed leaf

Adults wander during the daytime in search of food, since milkweeds live in patches that can vary in size and distance from one another. When a milkweed follicle is found, they inject saliva into it through their long rostrums, which pre-digests the seed and allows them to suck it up through their anterior pump and pharynx. Often, multiple individuals feed on one follicle, suggesting that a signal is released by feeding individuals that indicates a good food source. It has been shown that adults are more likely to find a food source when another adult is already feeding on it, further supporting the signaling concept. Occasionally, females are seen feeding on shedding exoskeletons from moulting individuals. Rarely, cannibalization is observed in laboratory settings.

Juveniles of O. fasciatus require the seeds of milkweed plants for development and growth. Adults can survive on other types of seeds, such as sunflower, watermelon, almond, and cashew, as shown in lab populations. Nymphs live in large groups of about 20 individuals per plant. Juveniles have a discontinuous, three-part gut that acts similarly to a crop, ventriculus, and ileum, but in fact each part is a section of the midgut, and there is no connection to the true ileum prior to the adult stage. During the final instar of development, oil accumulates, perhaps to allow for more efficient absorption of nutrients, aid in osmoregulation or preserve cleanliness of the habitat. It is expelled within 24 hours after the molt to adult, once a patent connection forms between the midgut and ileum.

== Laboratory use ==
The large milkweed bug is often used as a model organism and reared for laboratory experiments due to being easy to rear and handle, and having a short developmental time, few instars, and high fecundity. The phylogenetic placement of O. fasciatus is ideal to use as an outgroup to make comparisons to more derived holometabolous insects, acting as a valuable organism for the study of evolutionary patterns.

== Gallery ==
Early instar large milkweed bugs on milkweed late in the season

Late instar and adult large milkweed bugs on milkweed late in the season

Large milkweed bug flying, repeated at one-fifteenth speed

A banded orb weaving spider wraps up a large milkweed bug and subsequently cuts it from its web. This illustrates the protection the bug gains from feeding on milkweed.
