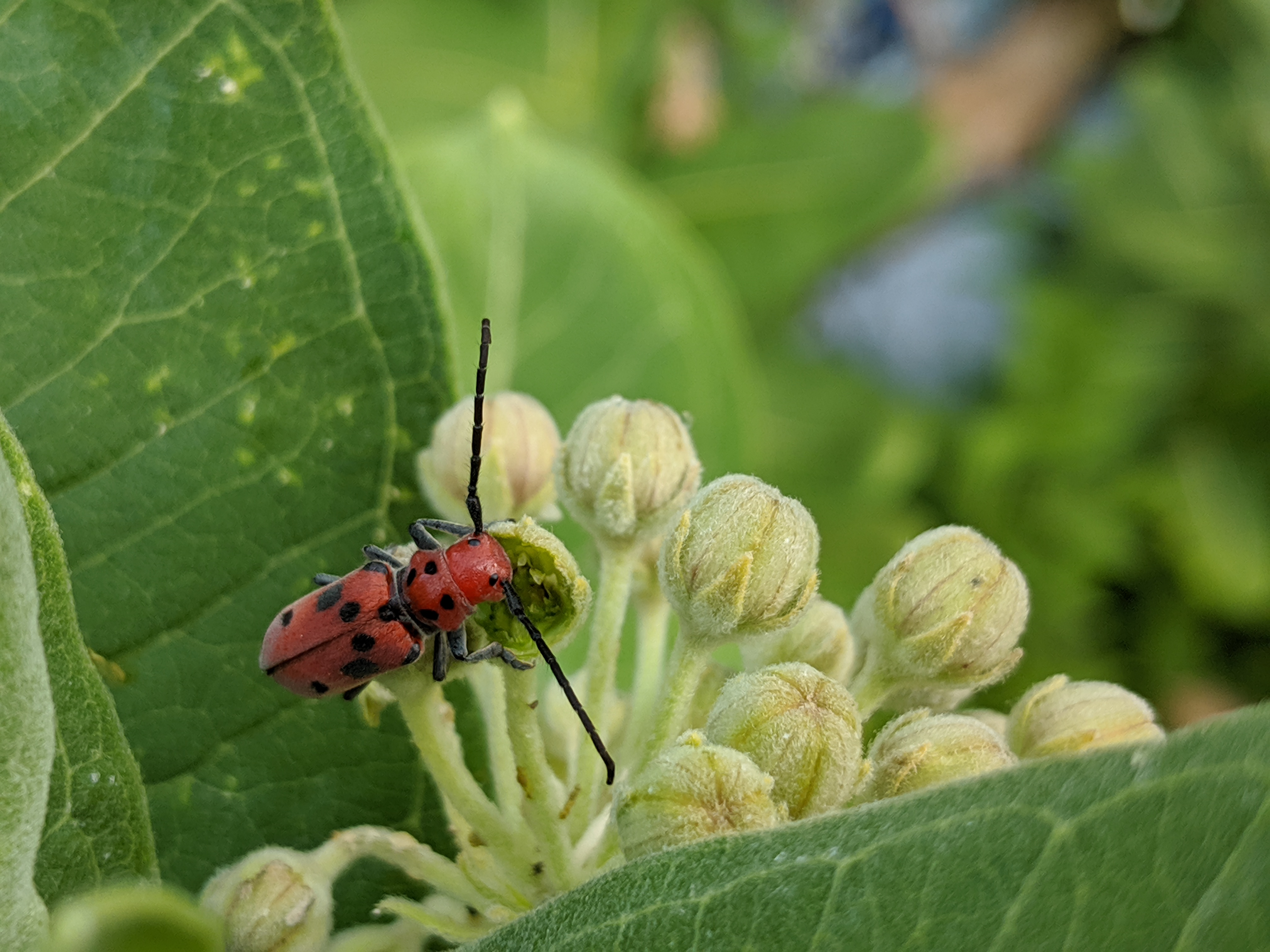

Scientific classification
- Kingdom: Animalia
- Phylum: Arthropoda
- Clade: Pancrustacea
- Class: Insecta
- Order: Coleoptera
- Suborder: Polyphaga
- Infraorder: Cucujiformia
- Family: Cerambycidae
- Genus: Tetraopes
- Species: T. tetrophthalmus

Binomial name
- Tetraopes tetrophthalmus (Forster, 1771)

Synonyms
- Cerambyx tetrophthalmus Forster, 1771; Lamia tornator Fabricius, 1775; Lamia fornator Fabricius, 1787 (Missp.); Lamia 13-punctata Drapiez, 1820; Tetraopes tredecimpunctatus Auctt. (Emend.); Tetraopes tetraophthalmus Provancher, 1877 (Emend.); Tetraopes humeralis Casey, 1913; Tetraopes tetrophthalmus iowensis Casey, 1913

= Tetraopes tetrophthalmus =

Species of beetle

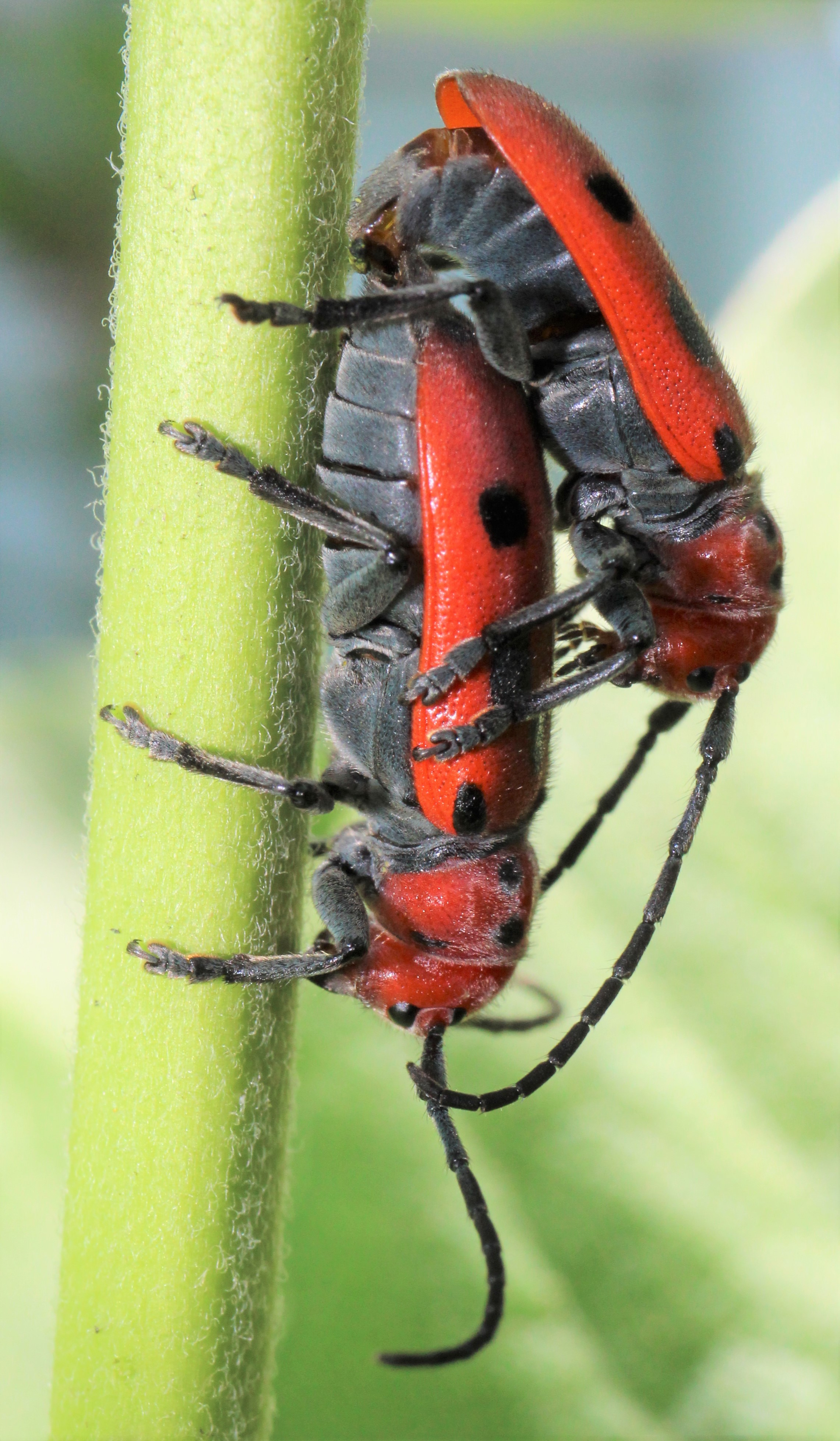
Mating pair

Tetraopes tetrophthalmus, the red milkweed beetle, is a beetle in the family Cerambycidae.

== Explanation of names ==
The binomial genus and species names are both derived from the Ancient Greek for "four eyes." As in many longhorn beetles, the antennae are situated very near the eye–in the red milkweed beetle, this adaptation has been carried to an extreme: the antennal base actually bisects the eye.

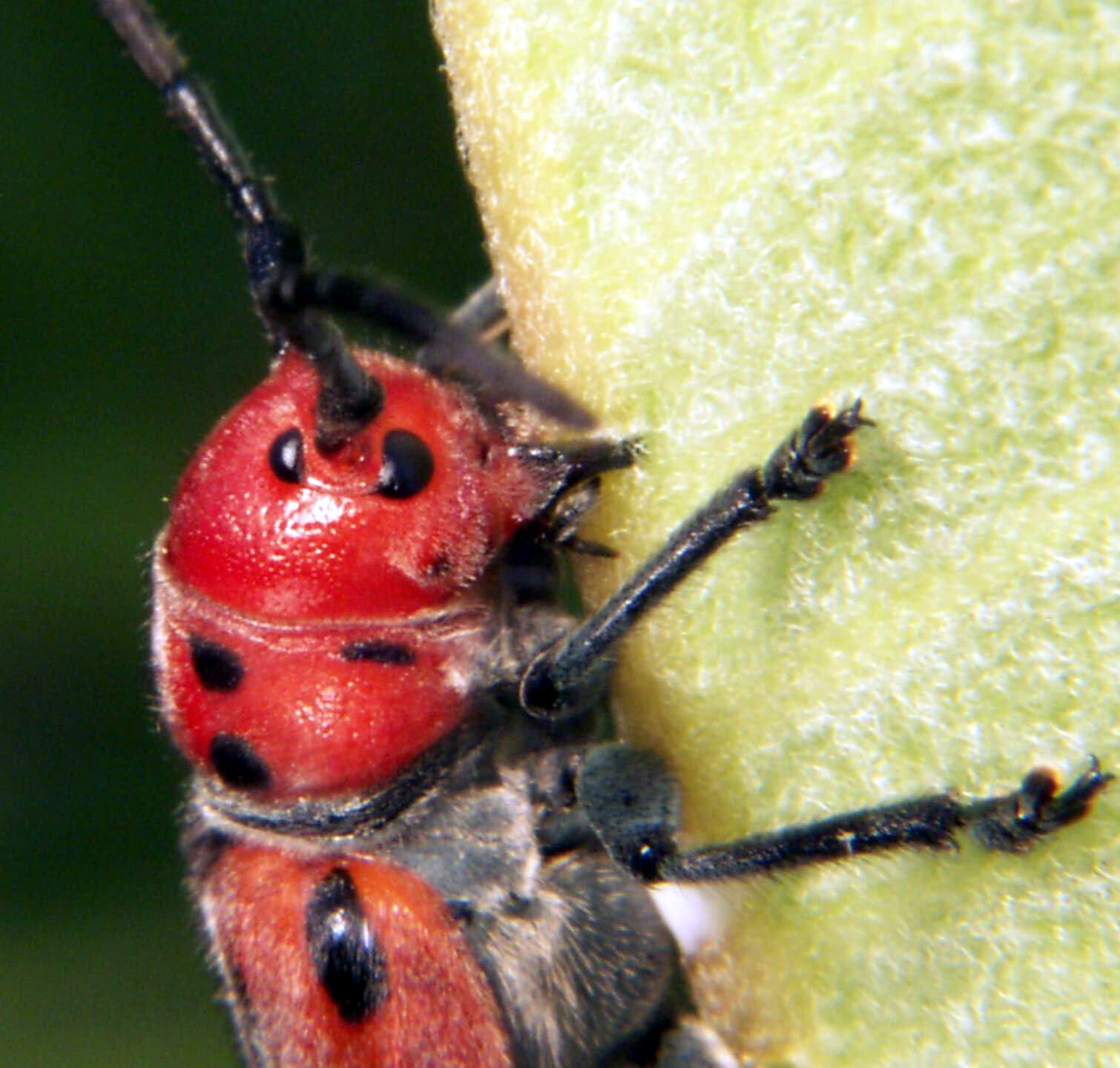
Detail showing bisected eyes

== Host plants ==
The milkweed beetle, an herbivore, is given this name because it is host-specific to common milkweed (Asclepias syriaca). It has been reported on horsetail milkweed (Asclepias verticillata) in a disturbed site in Illinois.

== Toxicity ==
Adults feed on the foliage and flowers of the plant, and the larvae feed on the roots. Therefore, much like the monarch butterfly, it is thought that the beetles derive some protection from predators by incorporating toxins from the plant into their bodies, thereby becoming distasteful. The red and black coloring are aposematic, advertising the beetles' inedibility.

== Behavior ==
These beetles feed by opening veins in the milkweed plant, decreasing the beetles' exposure to latex-like sap.

A red milkweed beetle cutting milkweed vein to reduce/stop latex pressure before feeding beyond the cut.

When startled, the beetles make a shrill noise, while they make a 'purring' noise when interacting with another beetle.

Mating milkweed beetles on common milkweed. The beetle vibrates when it is making a warning noise.

Red milkweed beetles lay egg-clutches in mid-summer inside the stem base of the milkweed plant.
