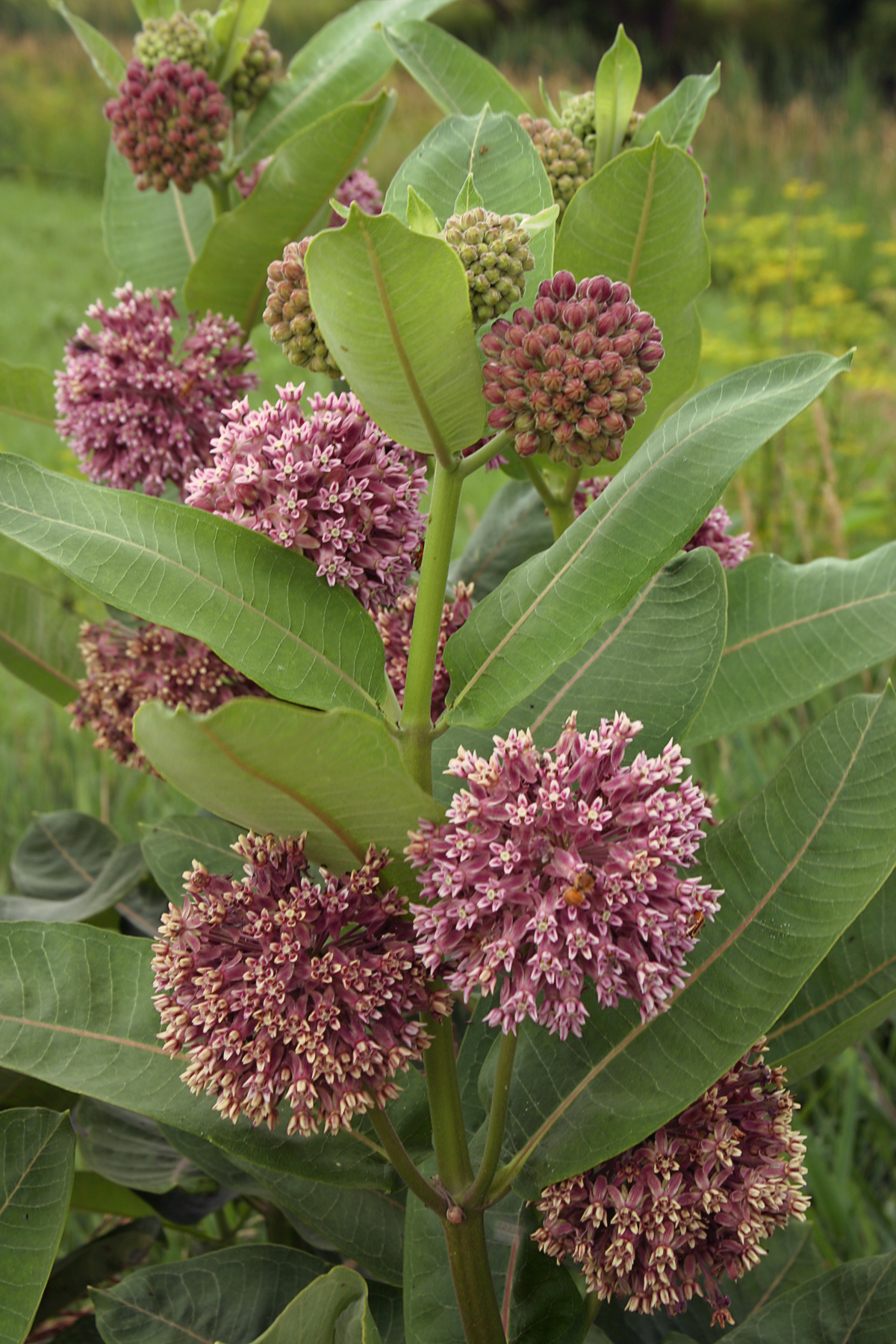

Conservation status
- Least Concern (IUCN 3.1)

- Secure (NatureServe)

Scientific classification
- Kingdom: Plantae
- Clade: Tracheophytes
- Clade: Angiosperms
- Clade: Eudicots
- Clade: Asterids
- Order: Gentianales
- Family: Apocynaceae
- Genus: Asclepias
- Species: A. syriaca

Binomial name
- Asclepias syriaca L.

= Asclepias syriaca =

Species of flowering plant

Asclepias syriaca, commonly called common milkweed, butterfly flower, silkweed, silky swallow-wort, and Virginia silkweed, is a species of flowering plant. It is native to southern Canada and much of the United States east of the Rocky Mountains, excluding the drier parts of the prairies. It is in the genus Asclepias, the milkweeds. It grows in sandy soils as well as other kinds of soils in sunny areas.

== Description ==
A. syriaca is a clonal perennial forb whose individual plants grow from propagative roots. All parts of the plants produce a white latex when cut. The plant typically grows to a height of 3 to 5 feet (0.91 to 1.52 m), but can reach 8 ft (2.4 m) in ditches and gardens. Its simple leaves are opposite, sometimes whorled, broadly ovate-lanceolate, and 1.5–4.75 inches (3.8–12.1 cm) wide, usually with entire, undulate margins and reddish main veins. Leaves have very short petioles and velvety undersides.

The highly fragrant, nectariferous flowers vary from white (rarely) through pinkish and purplish and occur in umbellate cymes. Individual flowers are about 1 cm (0.4 in) in diameter, each with five horn-like hoods and five pollinia. The seeds, each with long, white flossy hairs, occur in large follicles. Fruit production from self-fertilization is rare. In three study plots, outcrossed flowers had an average of about 11% fruit set.

== Ecology ==
Within its range, A. syriaca can be found in a broad array of habitats from croplands, to pastures, roadsides, ditches, and old fields. More than 450 insect species feed on the plant, including flies, beetles, ants, bees, wasps, and butterflies. It is among the most important food sources for monarch butterfly (Danaus plexippus) caterpillars in the northeastern and midwestern United States and is one of only three milkweed species on which the eastern monarch migration largely depends. Using cardenolide fingerprinting analysis, investigators have found that 85-92% of monarchs overwintering in Mexico had fed on A. syriaca as caterpillars.

In 2024, staff of the National Capital Planning Commission (the US federal government's planning agency for the National Capital Region) introduced a "Pollinator Best Practices Resource Guide". When discussing milkweeds, the Guide states that although more than 100 species of such plants are considered native to North America, Asclepias syriaca stands out and "is clearly an important species that is critical to the survival of monarch butterflies".

Large milkweed bug using its rostrum on the underside of the leaf

Other insects that feed on the plant include the red milkweed beetle (Tetraopes tetraophthalmus), the milkweed tussock caterpillar (Euchaetes egle), the large milkweed bug (Oncopeltus fasciatus), and the small milkweed bug (Lygaeus kalmii). The nonnative Aphis nerii (oleander aphid) can become abundant on milkweed shoots.

Many kinds of insects visit A. syriaca flowers, and some kinds pollinate them, including Apis mellifera, the Western honey bee, and native Bombus spp. (bumblebees). In the U.S. mid-Atlantic region, the introduced species A. mellifera was found to be the most "effective" pollinator, but this occurs more often among flowers of the same plant; since A. syriaca has a high level of self-incompatibility, it is less effective than Bombus spp. in the fertilization of flowers because Bombus are more likely to visit unrelated individuals.

Monarch populations may decline when milkweeds are eliminated with herbicides. The development and widely adopted cultivation of herbicide-resistant staple crops such as corn and soybeans have led to a massive reduction in weeds and native plants such as milkweeds. Consequently, this has played a significant part in the population decline of the monarch butterfly. In 2018, the chief executive officer (CEO) of the National Wildlife Federation stated that the monarch butterfly population had decreased by 90 percent during the previous 20 years and cited the reduction in milkweed as a contributing factor.

Many parts of the United States face a reduction in milkweed population due to factors such as increased habitat loss due to development, roadside median mowing, and herbicide use. Despite this, deforestation due to human settlement may have expanded the range and density of A. syriaca in some regions.

A. syriaca is now naturalized in many areas outside of its native range (from central and eastern Canada to north central and eastern United States). Naturalization has occurred in at least 23 countries worldwide. Introduced areas include Oregon, Newfoundland, the southeastern United States, much of Europe, and parts of western Asia. A. syriaca has been listed as an invasive alien species in the European Union since 2017, thus prohibiting the importation and trade of the plant within the Union.

Over 40 distinct pathogens of Asclepias species have been identified, including two dozen pathogens for A. syriaca. For example, milkweed yellows is an infectious disease caused by the milkweed yellows phytoplasma, a strain of bacteria distinguished by the absence of a cell wall.

== Cultivation ==
A. syriaca can become aggressive. It spreads from propagative roots and may not be suited to small gardens and formalized plantings. The plant is winter hardy in USDA zones 3–9; it has a preference for moist but well drained soils, but is tolerant of dry conditions and clay soils. Although A. syriaca grows best in full sun, it can tolerate light shade but may produce fewer flowers under such conditions. It is ideal in semi-dry places where it can spread without presenting problems for other ornamental species.

Monarch Watch provides information on rearing monarchs and their host plants. Efforts to restore falling monarch butterfly populations by establishing butterfly gardens and monarch migratory "waystations" require particular attention to the target species' food preferences and population cycles, as well to the conditions needed to propagate and maintain their food plants.

In the northeastern United States, monarch reproduction peaks in late summer when most A. syriaca leaves are old and tough. Plants that are mowed or cut back in June – August regrow rapidly from their roots in time for peak monarch egg-laying, when reproducing females have a preference for quickly-growing shoots whose foliage is tender and soft.

A. syriaca can be grown from seeds and propagative root cuttings. A U.S. Department of Agriculture conservation planting guide for Maryland recommends that, for optimum wildlife and pollinator habitat in mesic sites, a seed mix containing 30 seeds for each square foot of planting area should have 17.0% A. syriaca by weight and 6.0% by seed. The plant's seeds require a period of cold treatment (cold stratification) before they will germinate.

To protect seeds from washing away during heavy rains and from seed–eating birds, one can cover the seeds with a light fabric or with an 0.5 in (13 mm) layer of straw mulch. However, mulch acts as an insulator. Thicker layers of mulch can prevent seeds from germinating if they prevent soil temperatures from rising enough when winter ends. Further, few seedlings can push through a thick layer of mulch. Both seedlings and cuttings will usually bloom in their second year, although cuttings will occasionally bloom during their first year.

== Uses ==
The plant's latex contains large quantities of cardiac glycosides, making the leaves and stems of old tall plants toxic to humans and large animals. The young shoots, young leaves, flower buds and immature fruits are all edible raw.

Euell Gibbons, the author of Stalking the Wild Asparagus (1962), wrote that milkweed is bitter and toxic. However, he may have inadvertently prepared common dogbane (Apocynum cannabinum), a poisonous somewhat similar-looking plant instead. Gibbons devised a method to remove the bitterness and toxicity by plunging the young shoots into boiling water and cooking for one minute, repeating the procedure at least three times to make the plant safe to eat. Some modern foragers consider the bitterness and toxicity issue a myth. The plants have no bitterness when tasted raw, and can be cooked like asparagus, with no special processing.

The plant has been studied as a source of rubber from the latex of the plant, and as a fiber source from the seed fluff. The fluffy seed hairs have been used as the traditional background for mounted butterflies and other insects. The compressed floss has a silk-like sheen. The plant has also been explored for commercial use of its bast (inner bark) fiber, which is both strong and soft. U. S. Department of Agriculture studies in the 1890s and 1940s found that common milkweed has more potential for commercial processing than any other indigenous bast fiber plant, with estimated yields as high as hemp and quality as good as flax. Both the bast fiber and the floss were used historically by Native Americans for cordage and textiles. Milkweed has also been cultivated commercially to be used as insulation in winter coats.

Traditionally, in both North America and Europe, the plant was used to treat respiratory infections such as pleurisy.

== Genomics ==
The genome of A. syriaca has been sequenced. Genomic analysis of several hundred different A. syriaca plants from throughout the species natural range in eastern North America showed that this species is a single panmictic population that experienced expansions about 12,000 years ago, after the recession of North American glaciers, and more recently, about 200 years ago, during clearing of forests for agriculture in the eastern United States.

== Gallery ==
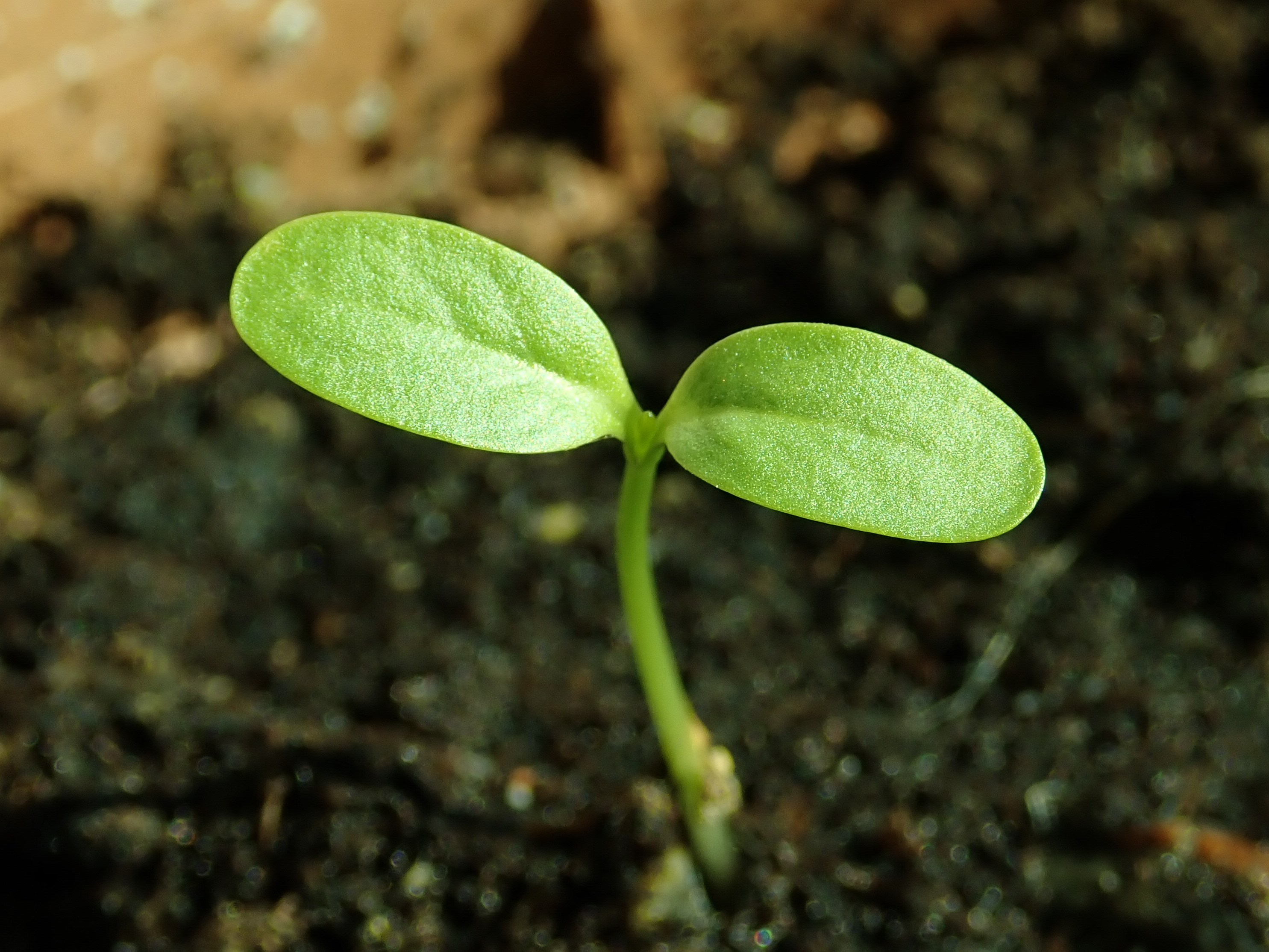
Seedling

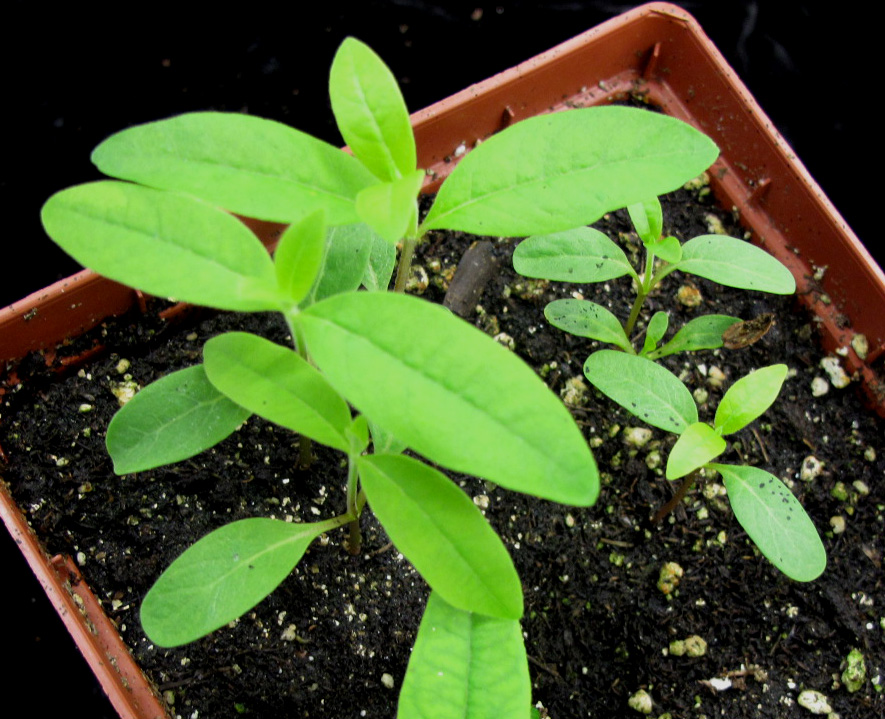
Young plants

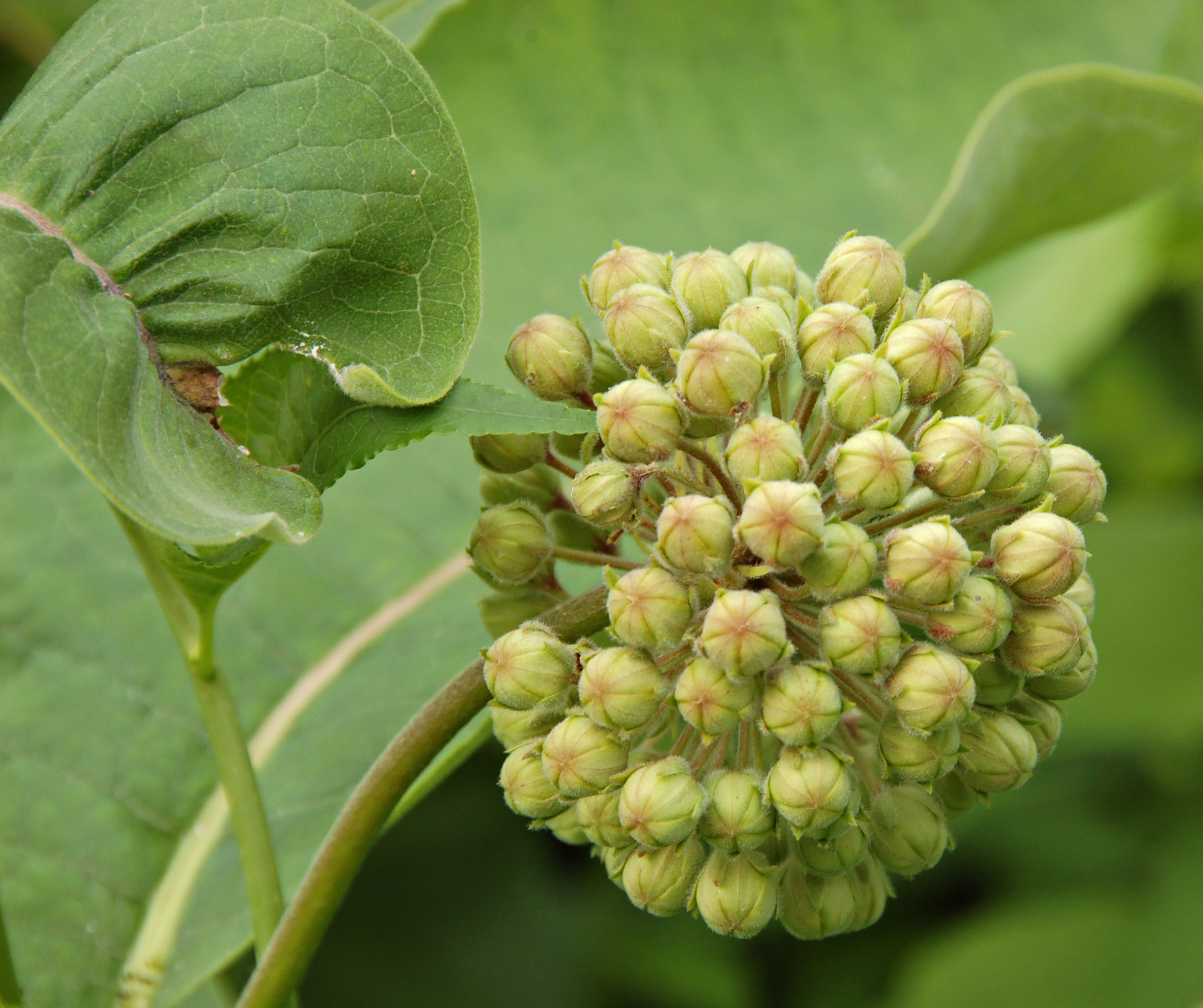
Buds in an umbelate cyme

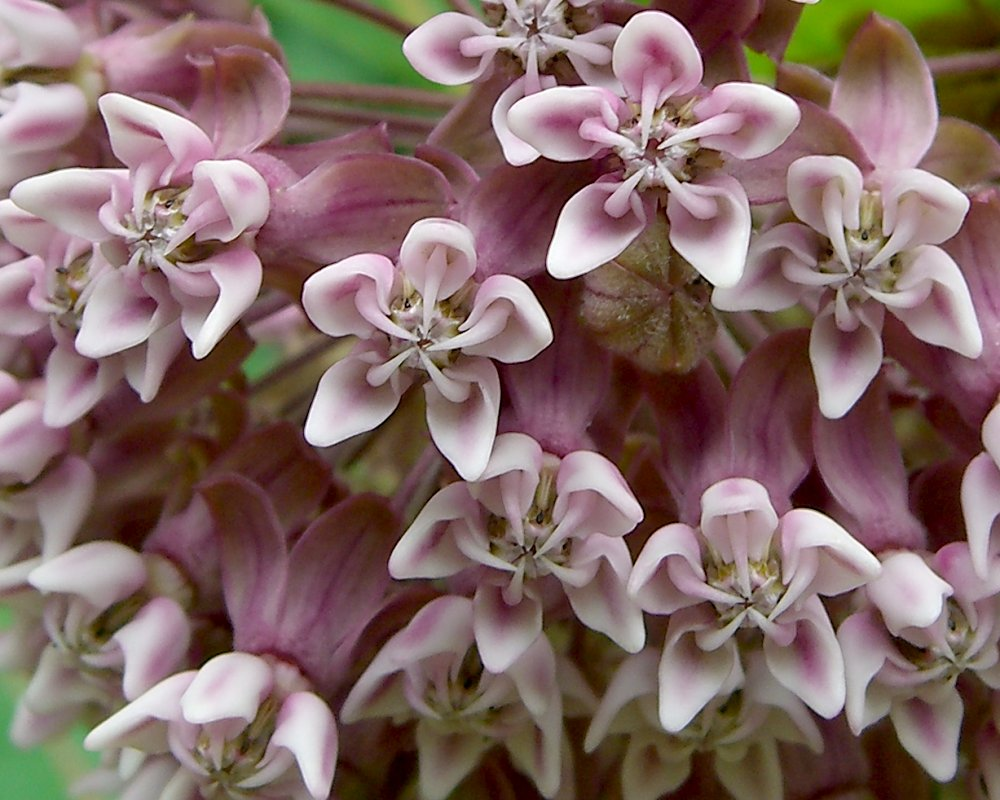
Flowers

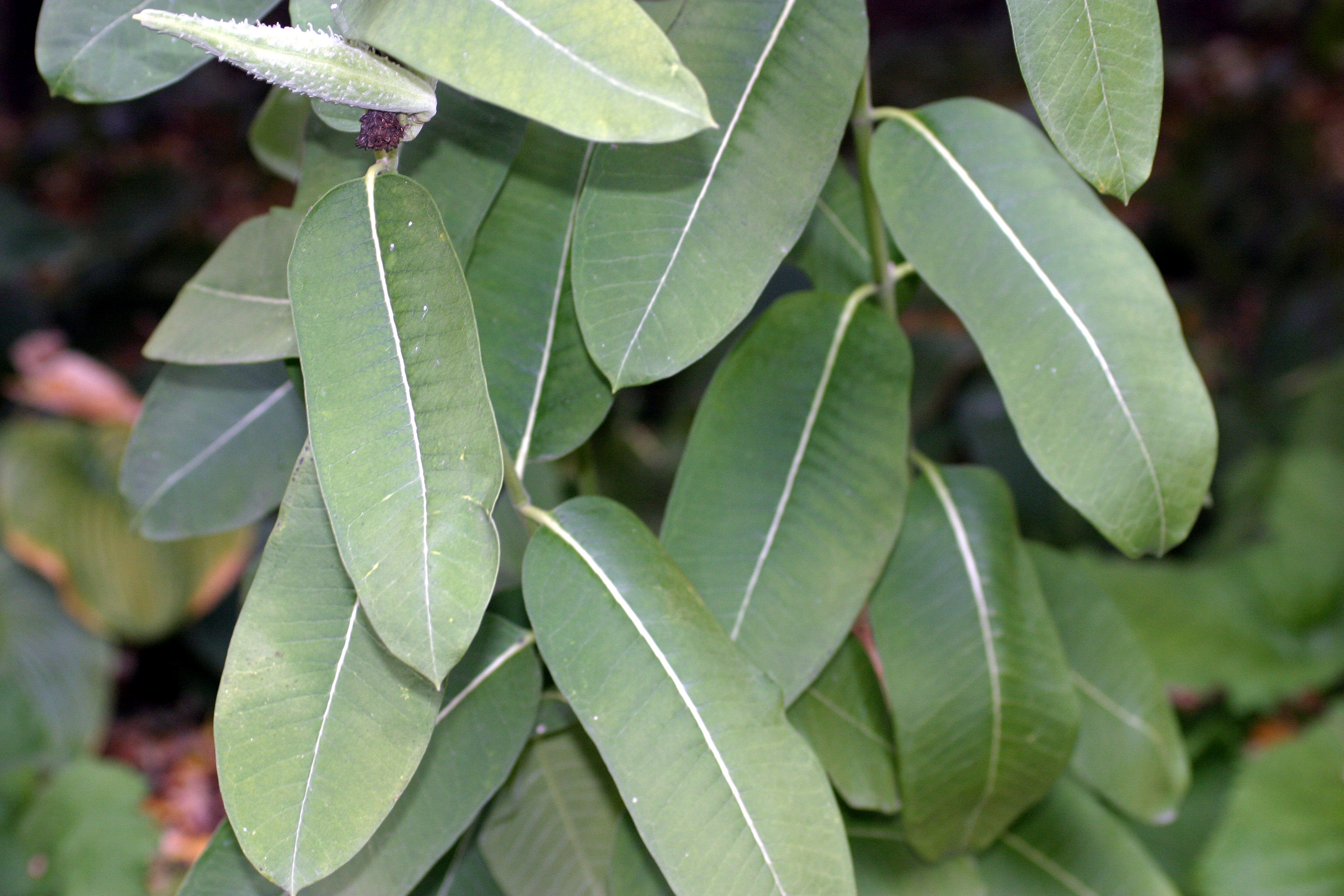
Leaves and young follicle

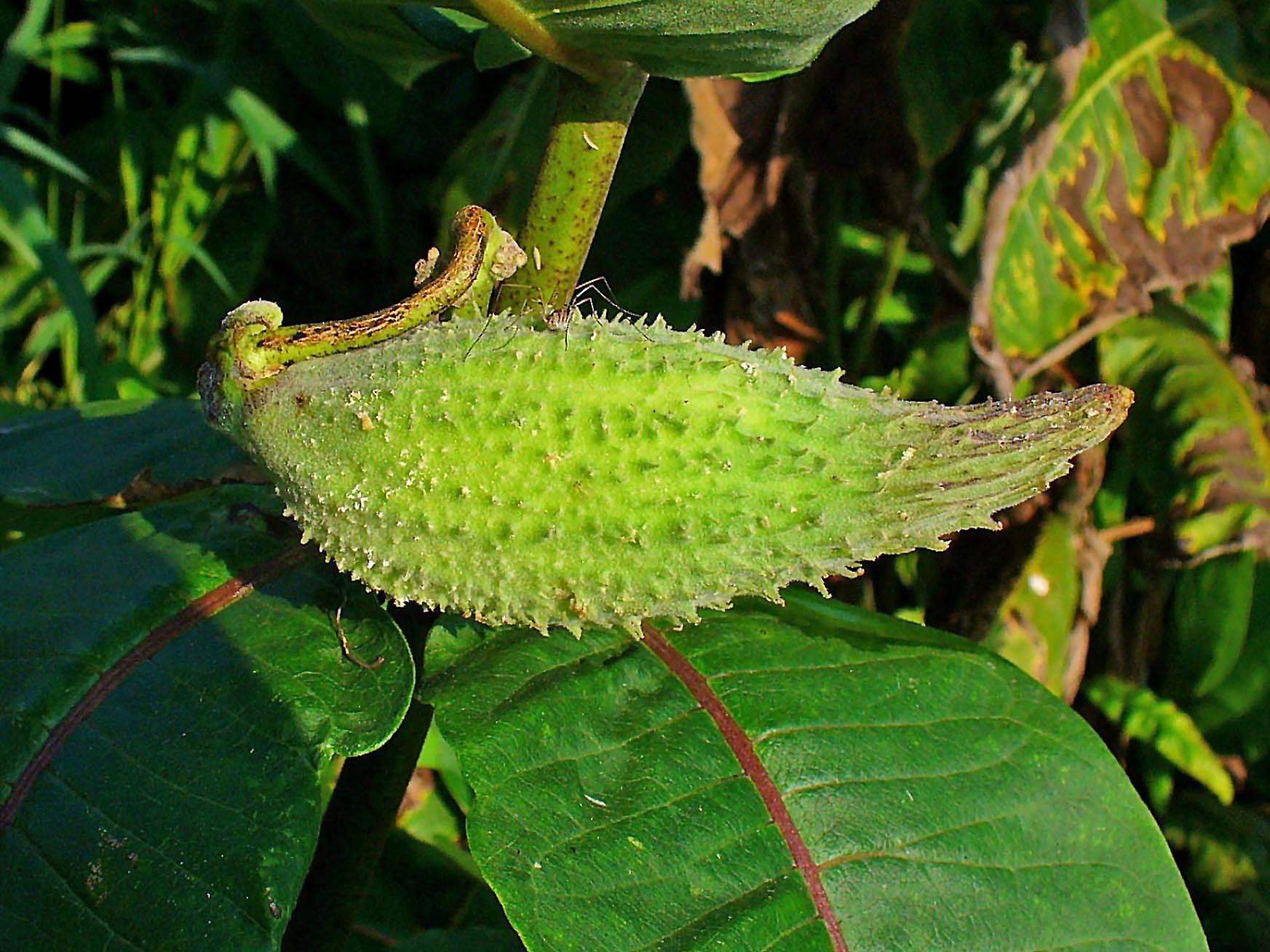
Mature follicle

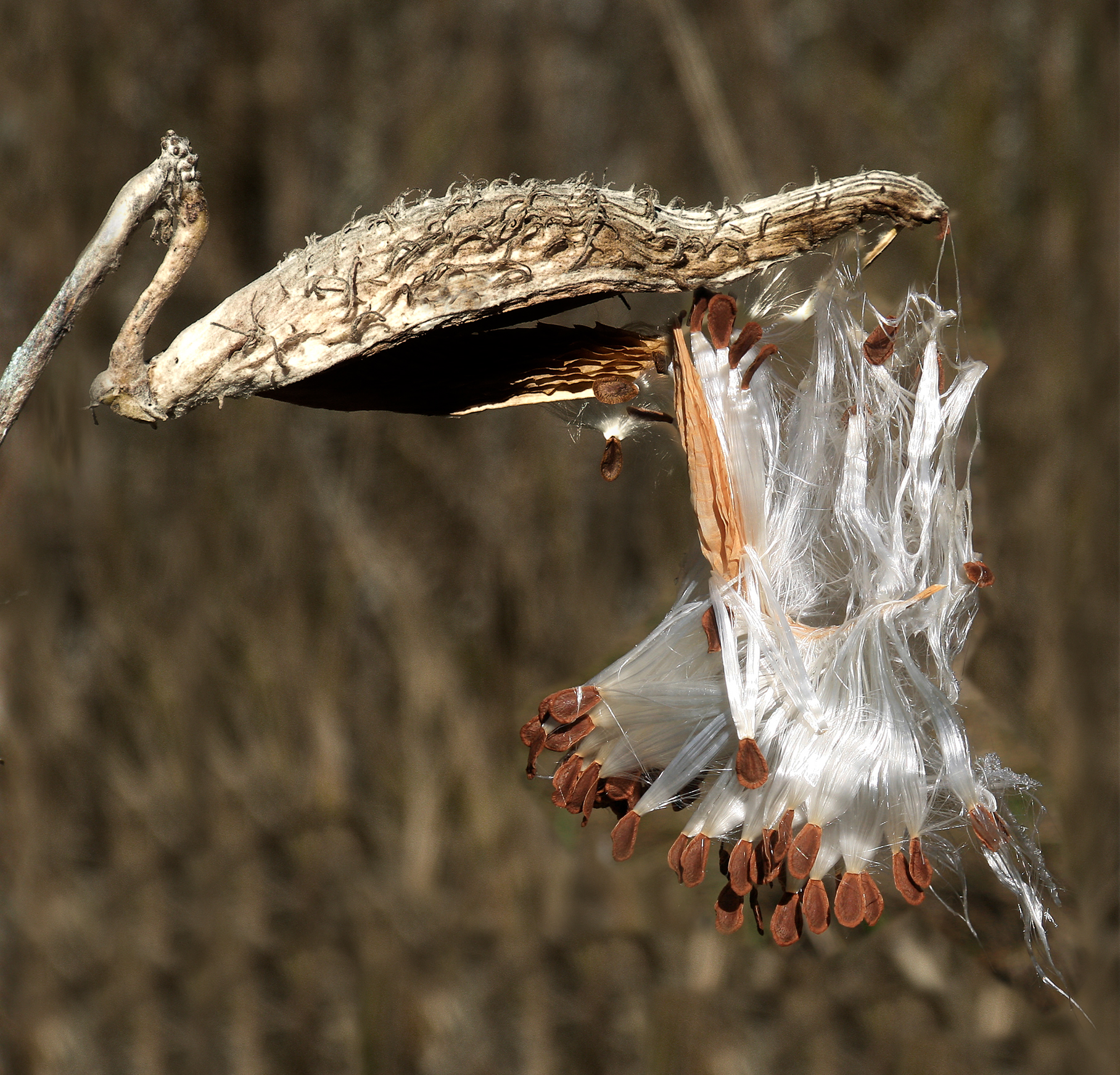
Seeds emerging from a follicle

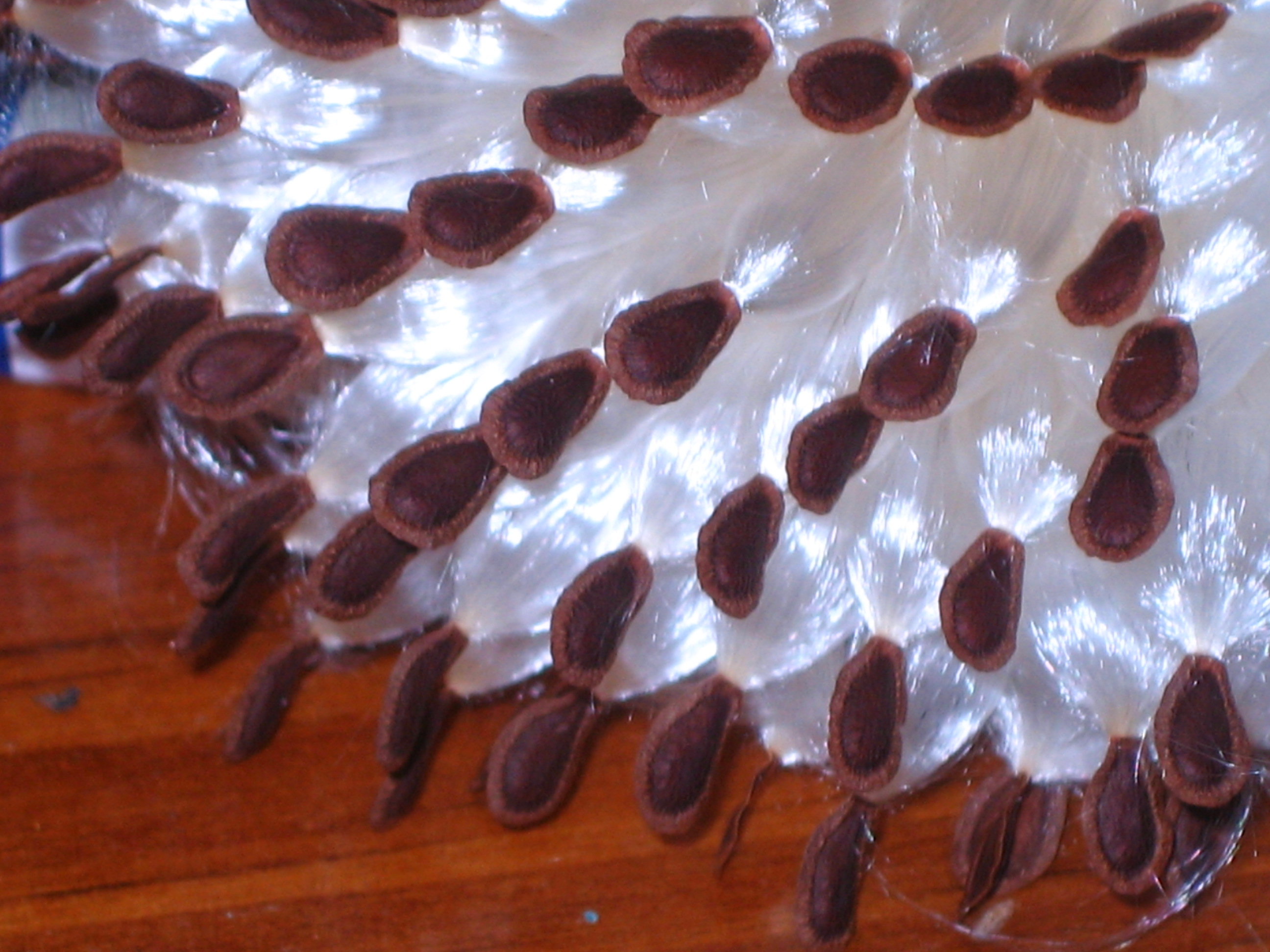
Seeds

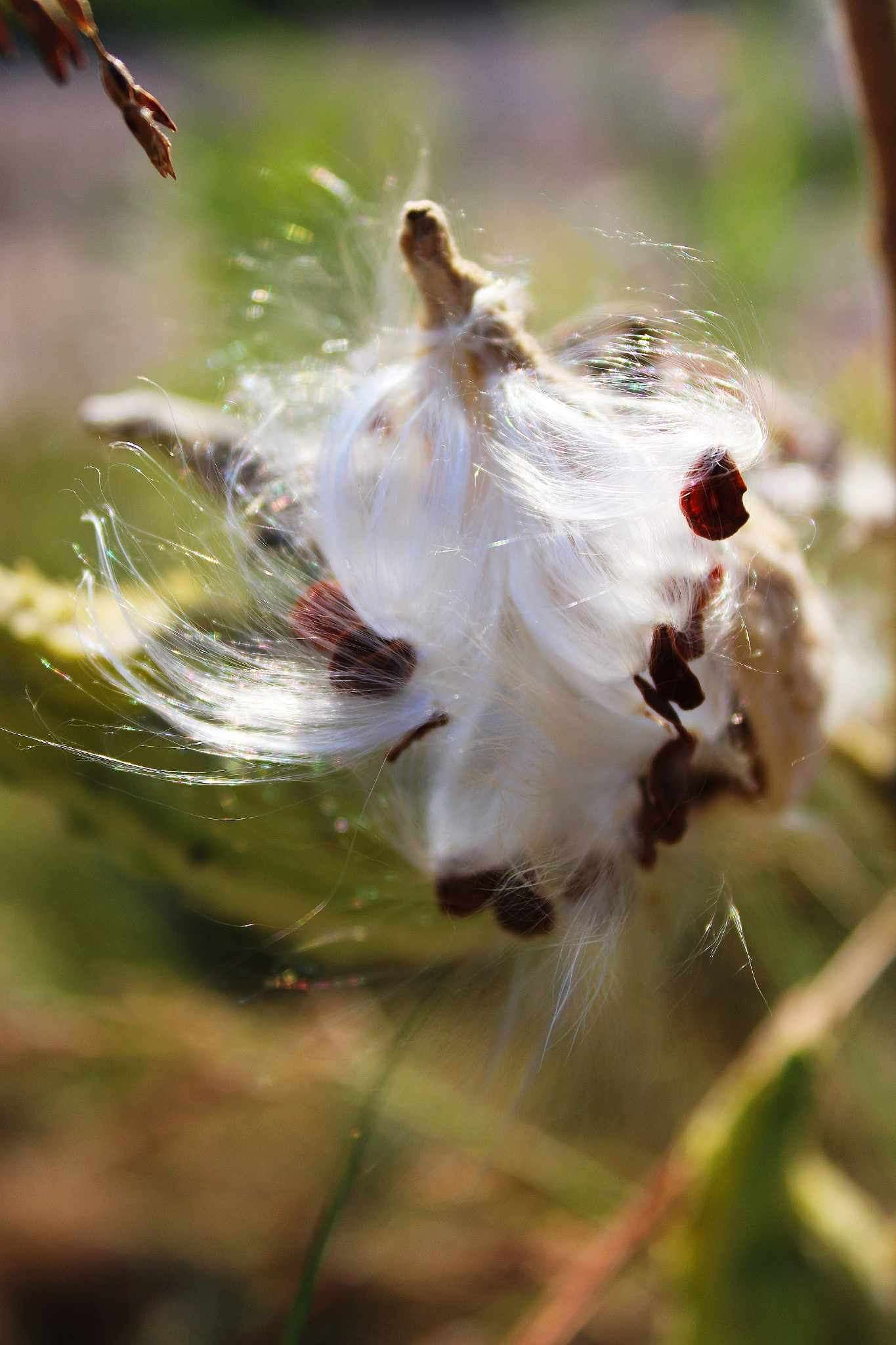
Pappus of Asclepias syriaca

milkweed seeds dispersed by the wind

Bumblebees feeding on A. syriaca
