= A. longissimus =

A. longissimus may refer to:

- Abacetus longissimus, a ground beetle
- Aneflus longissimus, a longhorn beetle
- Anilios longissimus, the extremely long blind snake, found in Australia
- Australiophilus longissimus, a centipede found in Australia
