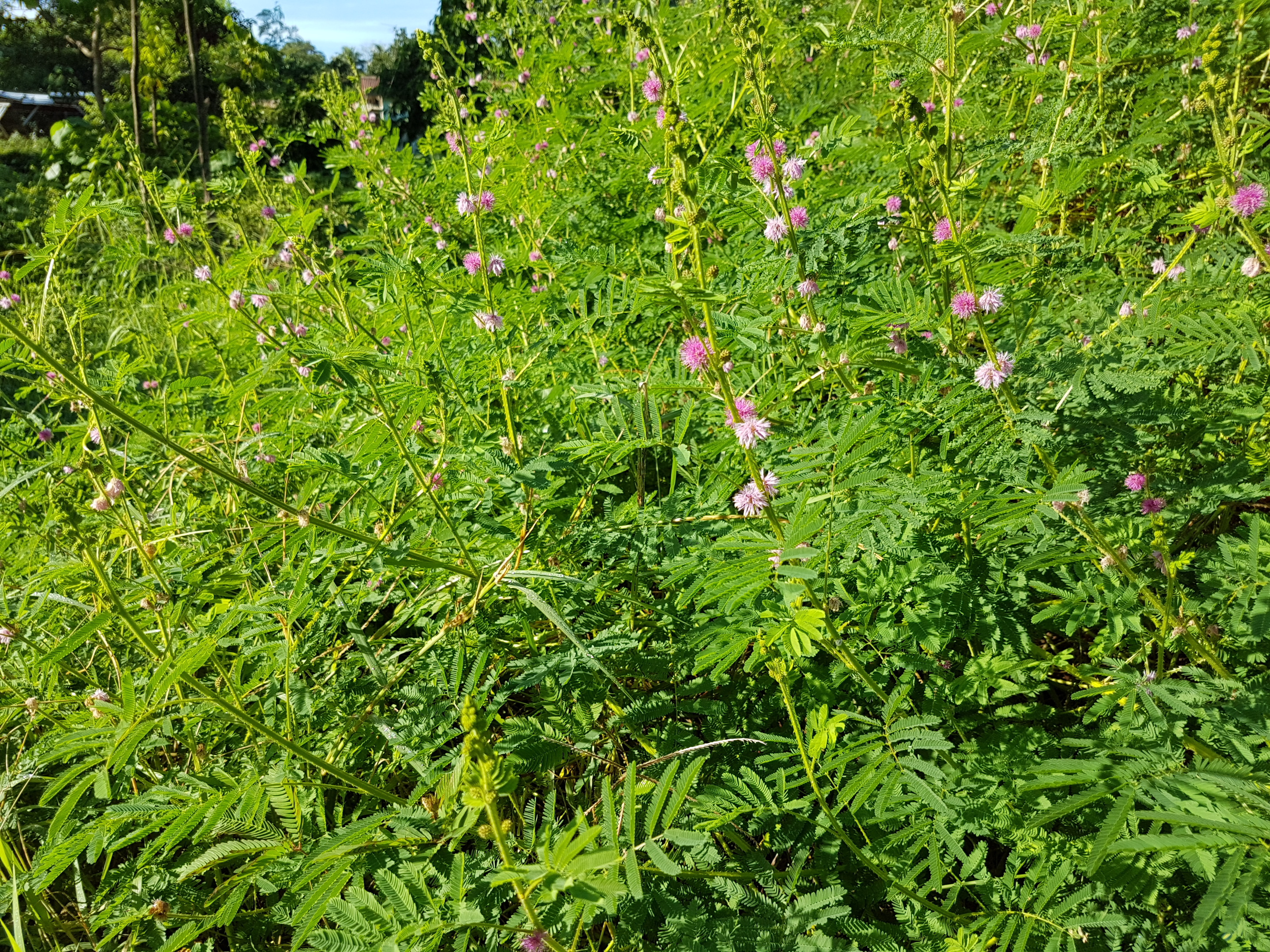
- Dense Mimosa diplotricha thicket in Bukidnon, Philippines
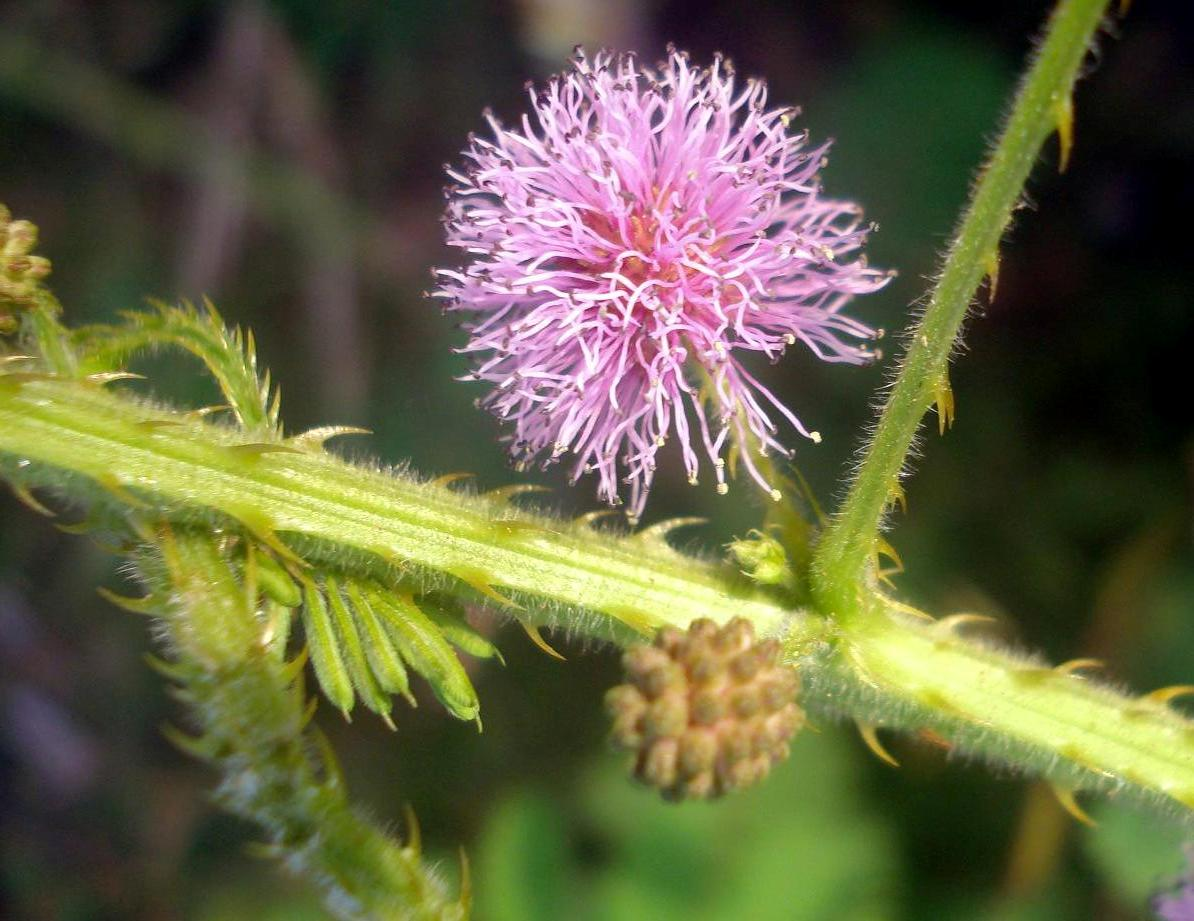
- Mimosa diplotricha inflorescence and thorns

Scientific classification
- Kingdom: Plantae
- Clade: Embryophytes
- Clade: Tracheophytes
- Clade: Angiosperms
- Clade: Eudicots
- Clade: Rosids
- Order: Fabales
- Family: Fabaceae
- Subfamily: Caesalpinioideae
- Clade: Mimosoid clade
- Genus: Mimosa
- Species: M. diplotricha

Binomial name
- Mimosa diplotricha C. Wright ex Sauvalle

= Mimosa diplotricha =

Giant sensitive plant

Species of plant

Mimosa diplotricha is a species of leguminous woody shrub native to the Neotropics. It is an invasive species and now has a pantropical distribution. It is commonly known as the giant sensitive plant, giant false sensitive plant, or nila grass.

== Taxonomy ==
Mimosa diplotricha is classified under the genus Mimosa in the subfamily Mimosoideae of the legume family, Fabaceae. It was first described by the American botanist Charles Wright in 1869. The specific epithet is derived from Ancient Greek διπλόος (diplóos, "double") and θρίξ (thríx, "hair").

Mimosa diplotricha was also described earlier by the German botanist Carl Friedrich Philipp von Martius as Mimosa invisa in 1837. But he had already given the name Mimosa invisa in 1834 to a different species. The name he gave is therefore a heterotypic posterior homonym and thus nomen illegitimum. Wright's name becomes the earliest correct name for the species, while the name Mimosa invisa is now accepted as the correct name for Mimosa rhodostachya. However the name Mimosa invisa is still used incorrectly by some authors for Mimosa diplotricha.

Mimosa diplotricha includes three varieties:

- Mimosa diplotricha var. diplotricha C. Wright ex Sauvalle- The nominate variety. Characterized by seed pods that are 10 to 25 mm (0.39 to 0.98 in) long, with 3 to 8 seeds.
- Mimosa diplotricha var. odibilis Barneby - Found only in Mexico, from Sinaloa to Michoacán. Characterized by seed pods that are 40 to 70 mm (1.6 to 2.8 in) long, with 12 to 16 seeds.
- Mimosa diplotricha var. inermis (Adelbert) Verdcourt - A thornless variety found in tropical Asia. It appears to be a de novo mutation that first arose in Indonesia and Papua New Guinea.

== Common names ==
Mimosa diplotricha is known as the giant sensitive plant, giant false sensitive plant, or nila grass in English.

In the Americas, it is known dormilona de playa, rabo de iguana; and raspancilla in Spanish; and grande sensitive or sensitive géante in French. It is also known as sensitiva trepadora in Cuba; and analeira, dormideira, juquiri-rasteiro, malicia-de-mulher, or sensitiva in Brazil.

In South Asia and Indochina it is known as anthottawadi or padaincha in India; banla saet in Cambodia; cõ trinh nu móc in Vietnam; and maiyaraap thao in Thailand. In Southeast Asia it is known as duri semalu in Malaysia; makahiyang lalaki, bulunsari, or balansuri in the Philippines; boring, borang, djoekoet borang, or puteri malu in Nusa Tenggara; pis koetjing in Indonesia; and rèmbètè in Java.

In Oceania it is known as nila grass in Papua New Guinea; co gadrogadro, wa ngandrongandro ni wa ngalelevu, or wa ngandrongandro levu in Fiji; vao fefe palagi or la'au fefe palagi in Samoa and the American Samoa; singbiguin sasa in Saipan; mechiuaiuu in Palau; and pikika'a papa'a in the Cook Islands.

== Description ==
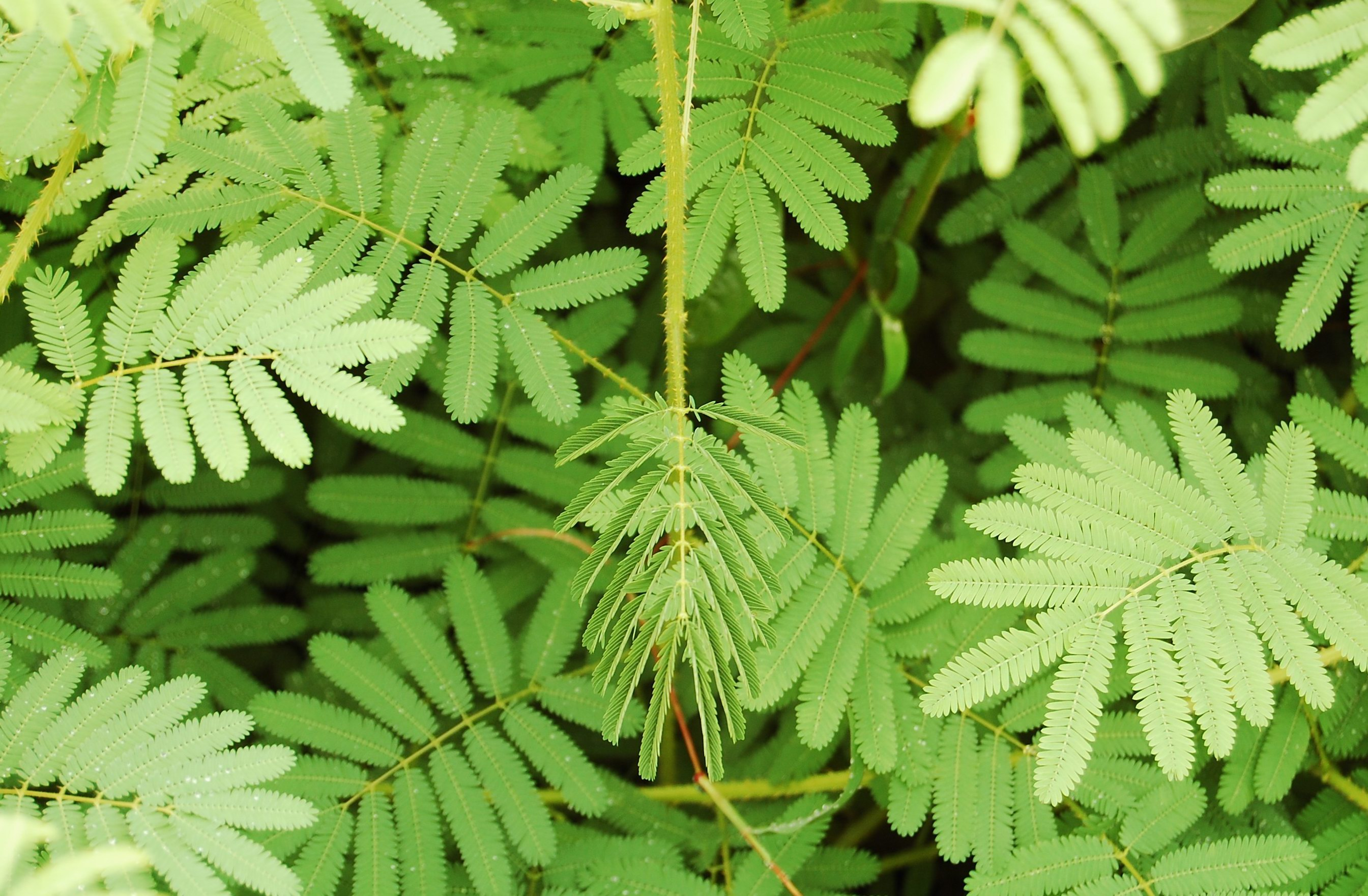
Mimosa diplotricha leaves that have curled up after being touched

Mimosa diplotricha grows as an erect shrub or a scrambling climber, reaching a height of around 3 m (9.8 ft). Its leaves are bipinnate and bright green with a feathery appearance. They are arranged alternately along the stems. Each leaf contains around twenty pairs of small sessile lanceolate leaflets arranged opposite each other. Each leaflet measures around 6 to 12 mm (0.24 to 0.47 in) long and 1.5 mm (0.059 in) wide. Like the related Mimosa pudica, the leaves are sensitive to touch, and will curl up if disturbed.

The stems are characteristically very long. They are squarish in cross-section, with four ridges running lengthwise. A dense row of very sharp recurved thorns run along the ridges, each around 3 to 6 mm (0.12 to 0.24 in) long. The flowers are pale pink and looks like a clustered fluffy ball. They are around 12 mm (0.47 in) in diameter and arise from short stalks from the leaf joints. The corolla is fused (gamopetalous), and there are two stamens for every petal.

The flowers develop into clustered slightly curved seed pods. Each seed pod is more or less flat and covered with small prickles. They are around 10 to 35 mm (0.39 to 1.38 in) long and 6 mm (0.24 in) wide. The seeds are oval-shaped and flat, each around 2 to 2.5 mm (0.079 to 0.098 in) long and 0.6 to 1.4 mm (0.024 to 0.055 in) thick. They are light brown and polished in appearance. They are dispersed through running water or by sticking to fur or clothing. They can remain dormant for up to 50 years.

== Distribution ==
Mimosa diplotricha is native to the tropical and subtropical regions of South America and Central America, including parts of the Caribbean. It is not known, however, if the species is native to North America.

== Invasive species ==
Mimosa diplotricha is fast-growing and can tolerate a wide range of soil and climate conditions. Left alone, they can form impenetrable thickets within a short period that can affect movement of both people and animals, as well as planted crops. All parts of the plant are toxic to grazing animals.

Mimosa diplotricha is extremely invasive and rapidly colonizes areas it is introduced to. The earliest records of Mimosa diplotricha outside of the Americas is in Java, Indonesia in 1900; Queensland, Australia in 1929; and Fiji in 1936. Since then, it has rapidly spread and naturalized throughout Southeast Asia, the Pacific Islands (including Hawaii), northern regions of Australia, and parts of Africa in the latter half of the 20th century.

== See also ==
- Mimosa pudica, the sensitive plant
