= Aneflus levettei =

Scientific classification
- Kingdom: Animalia
- Phylum: Arthropoda
- Class: Insecta
- Order: Coleoptera
- Suborder: Polyphaga
- Infraorder: Cucujiformia
- Family: Cerambycidae
- Genus: Aneflus
- Species: A. levettei

Binomial name
- Aneflus levettei (Casey, 1891)

Species of beetle

Aneflus levettei is a species of beetle in the family Cerambycidae. It was described by Casey in 1891. Larvae feed on the roots of Mimosa dysocarpa before pupating below the soil surface.
