= Environmental issues in Laos =

Laos is increasingly suffering from environmental problems, with deforestation a particularly significant issue, as expanding commercial exploitation of the forests, plans for additional hydroelectric facilities, foreign demand for wild animals and nonwood forest products for food and traditional medicines, and a growing population all create increasing pressure.

The United Nations Development Programme warns: "Protecting the environment and sustainable use of natural resources in Lao PDR is vital for poverty reduction and economic growth."

== Dams ==
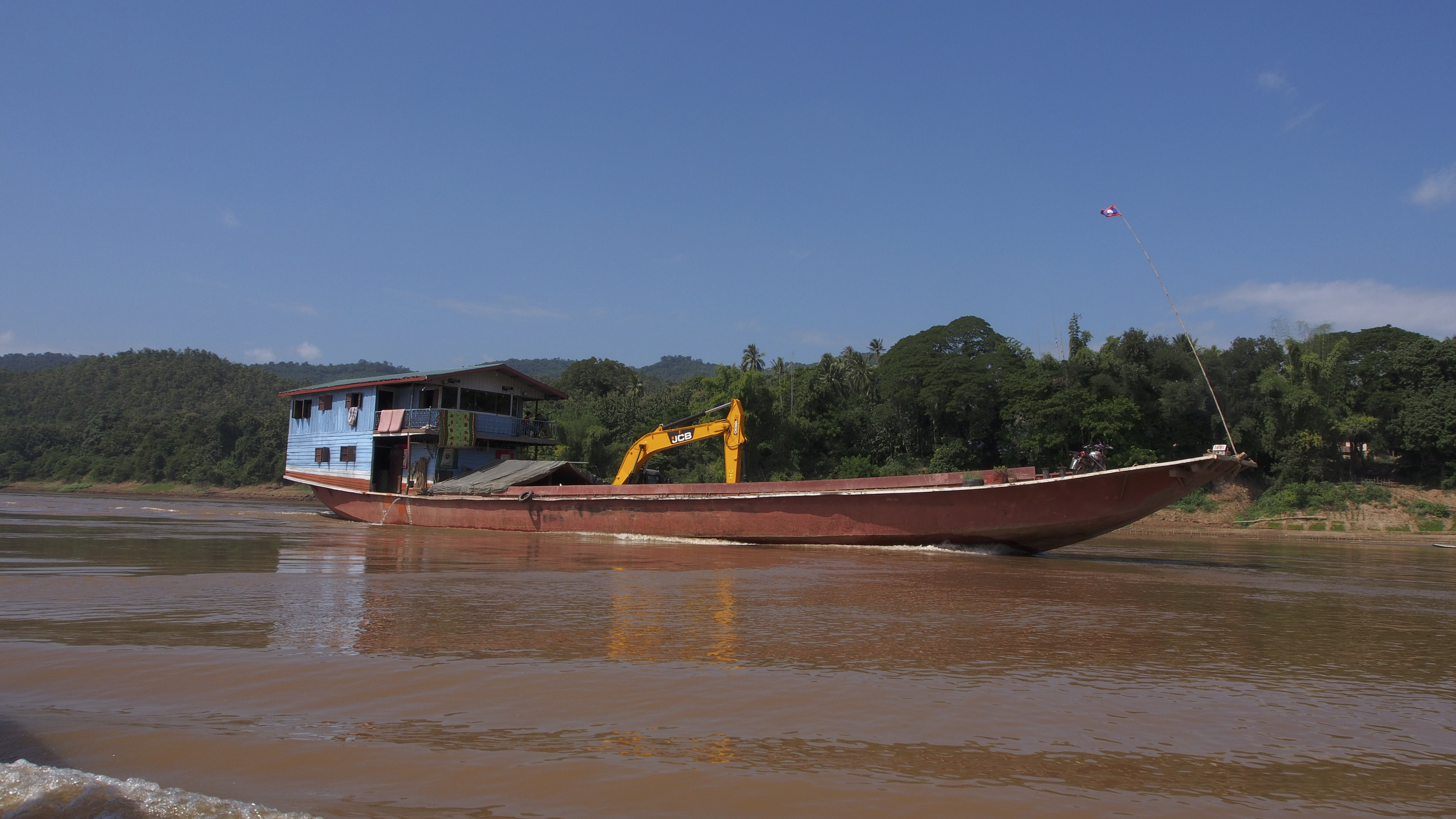
A freighter on the Mekong in Laos

Laos is a water-rich country which benefits immensely from the Mekong River and its tributaries for economic development, and demands for irrigation and hydropower are increasing. Damming of the Mekong in Laos negatively affects biodiversity and the hydrological profile of the river. In April 2011, The Independent newspaper reported that Laos had started work on the controversial Xayaburi Dam on the Mekong River without getting formal approval. Environmentalists say the dam will adversely affect 60 million people and Cambodia and Vietnam—concerned about the flow of water further downstream—are officially opposed to the project. The Mekong River Commission, a regional intergovernmental body designed to promote the "sustainable management" of the river, famed for its giant catfish, carried out a study that warned if Xayaburi and subsequent schemes went ahead, it would "fundamentally undermine the abundance, productivity and diversity of the Mekong fish resources". Neighbouring Vietnam warned that the dam would harm the Mekong Delta, which is the home to nearly 20 million people and supplies around 50 percent of Vietnam's rice output and over 70 percent of both its seafood and fruit output. By building dams Laos is willing to become the battery of Asia by selling electricity to its neighboring countries.

Milton Osborne, Visiting Fellow at the Lowy Institute for International Policy who has written widely on the Mekong, warns: "The future scenario is of the Mekong ceasing to be a bounteous source of fish and guarantor of agricultural richness, with the great river below China becoming little more than a series of unproductive lakes."

== Deforestation ==
Illegal logging is also a major problem. Environmental groups estimate that 500,000 cubic metres (18,000,000 cu ft) of logs are being cut by Vietnam People's Army (VPA) forces, and companies it owns, in co-operation with the Lao People's Army and then transported from Laos to Vietnam every year, with most of the furniture eventually exported to western countries by the VPA-owned companies.

A 1992 government survey indicated that forests occupied about 48 percent of Laos's land area. Forest coverage decreased to 41 percent in a 2002 survey. Lao authorities have said that, in reality, forest coverage might be no more than 35 percent because of development projects such as dams, on top of the losses to illegal logging.

Most of the deforestation during the 1980s stemmed from the northern region in which the poor destroyed about 300,000 hectares annually. A study conducted in Savannakhet Province revealed a pattern in which the households extracting resources from the forest tended to be the rural poor. It cross referenced the data collected from two groups, the poor and the wealthy to identify possible correlations between welfare and the dependency on the extraction of natural resources to support one's livelihood. Compared to the wealthy group, the poor had higher levels of exposure to environmental, health, and economic shocks in addition to having little capital such as education and financial assets. While the poor depended more on nonwood commodities from the forest to increase food security, the wealthier group would harvest timber and wood for environmental income. A study found a correlation between the loss of forest coverage with socio-economic development and physical factors, such as the elevation and slope of the land or its distance to main roads. The closer a forest was situated to a main road, the increased chances of deforestation; the same applied to the proximity of villages to nearby forests. Furthermore, high elevation areas in the mountains tended to faced higher deforestation rates compared to the flat lands or lower areas. While there is a higher amount of settlements and villages in the lower flat lands, most of the human activities is concentrated in the higher areas thus explaining the different rates. A plethora of environmental issues contributing to the deforestation include problems with the urban environment, mismanaged mineral exploitation, and careless development planning for industrial and transportation sectors.

Laos had a 2018 Forest Landscape Integrity Index mean score of 5.59/10, ranking it 98th globally out of 172 countries.

== Invasive species ==
Among the many ongoing issues threatening Lao's ecosystem with deforestation, there is a growing concern about Invasive Alien Species (IAS) contributing to the environmental degradation and loss of biodiversity. Bringing in alien species to promote economic development has brought notable success such as coffee, which is now one of Lao's main exports. However, as non native plants or species proliferate, new diseases and pests also become an issue which upsets the natural balance of the ecosystem. This prompts farmers to use extensive commercial herbicides to protect their crops from species such as the Mimosa Invisa and Mimosa Pigra weeds, further damaging the land in the long run. Ever since the Golden Apple Snail (GAS) was introduced to Laos from Vietnam in 1994 as a new source of food, it has spread through waterways and human transport to 10 of Lao's 17 provinces causing many fields to become infested with snails. One of the unintended consequences of this alien species being brought to Laos was the unforeseeable damage to rice paddies, prompting farmers to forgo hand-picking and instead use pesticides for the heavily infested fields leading to chemical runoff. In addition to the chemical pollution in the water threatening the health of aquatic animals and people working in the paddies, many farmers also experienced severe injuries in the field from stepping on the snail shells.

== Conservation efforts ==
Government intervention policies have been implemented to address concerns such as unsustainable timber harvesting, slash-and-burn cultivation, and the allocation of forestland to other purposes such as agriculture, industry, and infrastructure development. The major causes of continued forest degradation from that point onward was not due to policy failure, but rather a lack of multiple factors which include: funding, law enforcement, experienced workers, and organization in the economic sector. Despite all this, there have been other policy attempts and interventions that have been successful in aiding the problem. Reducing the rural population, allowing for tree plantation development, and transitioning from upland rice cultivation to commercial market oriented agricultural practices, contributed to the efforts increasing the amount of forest coverage in Laos. From 1999-2011 most of the country saw significant declines in the land area used for upland rice cultivation, which was offset by a corresponding increase in lowland rice cultivation. Of the commercial market oriented agricultural practices, the one that saw great success in forest coverage increase is linked to the Southern region's rubber plantations, which has been increasing in number due to rubber being a valuable commodity giving farmers incentive to plant more trees. While it did increase forest coverage, native forests and shifting cultivation lands were subject to change and decline as they were transformed into rubber plantations especially during the boom periods of rubber prices, reducing the overall biodiversity in the ecosystem.

== Government policies ==
As a means of regulating the country's environmental degradation, the Laos government implemented a new article to the Environmental Protection Law in 2013 that requires the natural resources and environment sector to develop a report every three years to assess the current state of the environment. Amidst the implementation of new laws, however, to regulate the logging industry, there has not been much transparency regarding the provincial government's involvement with the smuggling and foreign investors. Despite implementing the national export ban on timber in 2016, logs are still being smuggled on a regular basis to Lao's neighboring countries, particularly China and Vietnam to be used as materials for luxury furniture. An anonymous witness account revealed that particular provincial governors are safeguarding the hidden illegal lumber, manipulating the reports, and hiding the total number of seized logs to protect the interests of their foreign investors. As such there seems to be a lack of oversight in the ongoing matter.

== NGOs and activism ==
USAID also implemented a program called Lowering Emissions in Asia's Forests (LEAF) from 2011 to 2016 to reduce greenhouse gases and minimize the consequences of deforestation. While USAID LEAF was overseeing one of the National Biodiversity Conservation Area (NBCA) in Nam Xam, Laos, Climate Protection Through Avoided Deforestation (CliPAD) also simultaneously initiated their project in the Nam Et-Phou Louey National Protected Area (NPA) which provided a complementary foundation for USAID LEAF to work upon. USAID LEAF worked in conjunction with the CliPAD project to provide participatory land use planning as well as animal husbandry to prepare the communities for future provincial REDD+ strategies. In introducing participatory land use planning into the provinces, districts developed management plans to allocate natural resources or approved land in a substantially more eco-friendly manner by allowing for better community security and conditions over forest resources. They also were involved in monitoring livestock management for quality over quantity, and in doing so decreased the concerns of excessive forest grazing while collectively increasing community income. They also were involved in monitoring livestock management for quality over quantity, and in doing so decreased the concerns of excessive forest grazing while collectively increasing community income. However, due to a lack of strong political leadership, the collaborative efforts between LEAF and CliPAD were impeded, resulting in LEAF downsizing the scope of the programs and processes. Furthermore, constant regulatory and legislative changes continued to occur in the national and provincial levels, which discouraged the plans of LEAF, but ultimately shifted the focus more on the local level leading to successful outcomes with local stakeholders.

Funded by the German government through the KfW development bank, the GIZ CliPAD project oversaw the creation of a national and provincial REDD+ framework through local-level mitigation measures and sustainable financing models. Similarly to the USAID LEAF project, it provided support through capacity building measures such as conducting participatory land use planning in 87 villages. In addition, it arranged law enforcement training for 162 officers from the Provincial Office of Forest Inspection as a means to effectively deal with poachers and illegal logging. Local communities were prompted to apply the learned sustainable practices regarding natural resource management and explore alternative means of income, to reduce the dependency on the environment's natural resources. In addition to the capacity building measures, CliPAD also provided support for establishing the necessary legal framework to launch REDD+ by aiding in the forest law revision process.
