= Mimosa texana =

Scientific classification
- Kingdom: Plantae
- Clade: Tracheophytes
- Clade: Angiosperms
- Clade: Eudicots
- Clade: Rosids
- Order: Fabales
- Family: Fabaceae
- Subfamily: Caesalpinioideae
- Clade: Mimosoid clade
- Genus: Mimosa
- Species: M. texana

Binomial name
- Mimosa texana (A. Gray) Small

Synonyms
- Mimosa biuncifera; Mimosa borealis var. texana; Mimosa wherryana; Mimopsis wherryana

Species of legume

Mimosa texana is a shrub in the family Fabaceae. It is commonly known as Texas Mimosa, Texas Catclaw, or Wherry Mimosa and is endemic to upland regions of Mexico and Texas. This species was once classified as Mimosa biuncifera but it was found that phenotypic variations occurred across its range and a new taxonomy was proposed by Rupert C. Barneby in 1986, splitting the species into Mimosa aculeaticarpa var. biuncifera and Mimosa texana.

== Distribution ==
Texas Mimosa is found on alkaline soils in northeastern Mexico and in Texas across the southern Trans-Pecos and Edwards Plateau as well as in south Texas in the vicinity of Zapata and Starr counties. It is uncommon and grows on caliche and gravelly hillsides.

== Description ==
This species is a straggly many-branched deciduous shrub of up to two metres tall. It has slender zigzag dark-colored twigs armed below leaf nodes with backward-curved prickles. The alternate bipinnate leaves typically have 1 to 5 pairs of pinnae per leaf with 3 to 9 pairs of leaflets per pinna. The globular flowers can vary from creamy-white to deep pink and typically reach peak bloom each year in April, although the species can bloom following rains anytime between March and September. The flowers are fragrant and attract numerous insects. The seedpods are brick red and flattened with prickly edges and are typically produced from May through October.
