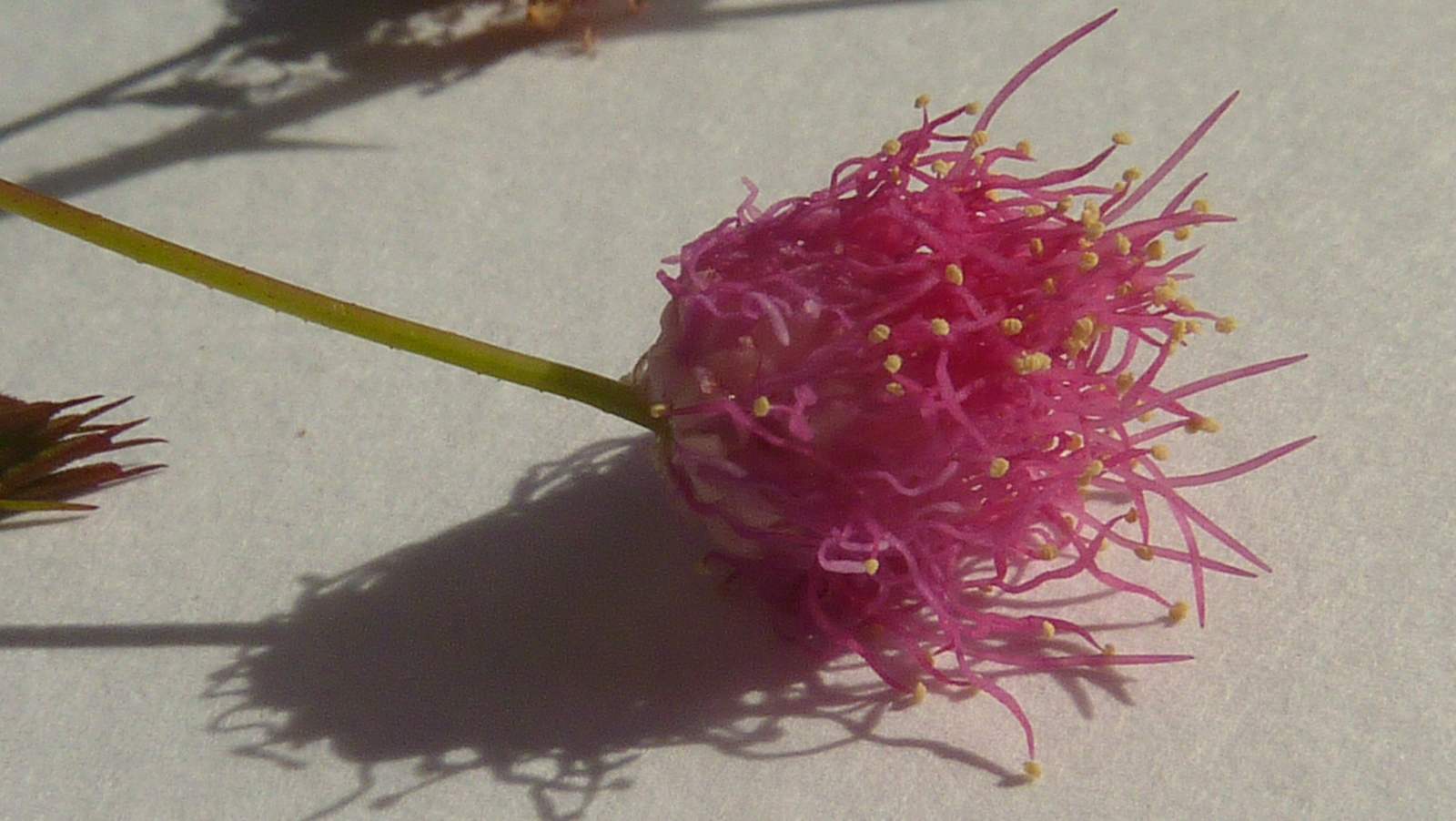

Scientific classification
- Kingdom: Plantae
- Clade: Tracheophytes
- Clade: Angiosperms
- Clade: Eudicots
- Clade: Rosids
- Order: Fabales
- Family: Fabaceae
- Subfamily: Caesalpinioideae
- Clade: Mimosoid clade
- Genus: Mimosa
- Species: M. somnians

Binomial name
- Mimosa somnians Humb. & Bonpl. ex Willd.

Synonyms
- Mimosa acutiflora Benth.; Mimosa palpitans Willd.; Mimosa podocarpa Benth.; Mimosa quadrijuga Benth.; Mimosa somnians Willd. var. podocarpa (Benth.)Niederl.; Mimosa somnians Willd. var. quadrijuga Niederl.; Mimosa somniculosa Kunth

= Mimosa somnians =

Species of plant

Mimosa somnians, commonly known as dormideira, is a species of woody shrub in the genus Mimosa and the family Fabaceae. It is native to the Caribbean, Central America and South America. It is a short, low-lying shrub with minuscule thorns lining its stem-like hairs.

Mimosa somnians is notable for exhibiting rapid plant movement. Its leaves are sensitive to tactile stimulus, folding quickly when touched, similar to Mimosa pudica. It can be differentiated from Mimosa pudica in that its leaves are bipinnate, there are more than four subbranchlets and these originate from more than one point on the branch.

Mimosa somnians's leaflets are 4–5 mm long. The flowers form pink balls. It propagates by seeds.

== Forms, subspecies and varieties ==
- Mimosa somnians f. viscida
- Mimosa somnians subsp. longipes
- Mimosa somnians subsp. viscida
- Mimosa somnians var. aquatica
- Mimosa somnians var. deminuta
- Mimosa somnians var. diminuta
- Mimosa somnians var. glandulosa
- Mimosa somnians var. lasiocarpa
- Mimosa somnians var. leptocaulis
- Mimosa somnians var. longipes
- Mimosa somnians var. lupulina
- Mimosa somnians var. possensis
- Mimosa somnians var. somnians
- Mimosa somnians var. velascoensis
- Mimosa somnians var. viscida

== Uses ==
In Guyana, it is used to calm down irritable children via washing.

== Chemical constituents ==
Mimosa somnians contains (whole plant) about 0.029% tryptamine and about 0.029% methyltryptamine.
