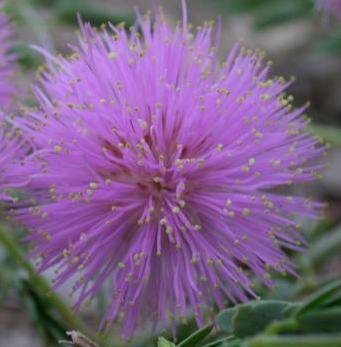
- Mimosa borealis flower

Conservation status
- Secure (NatureServe)

Scientific classification
- Kingdom: Plantae
- Clade: Embryophytes
- Clade: Tracheophytes
- Clade: Angiosperms
- Clade: Eudicots
- Clade: Rosids
- Order: Fabales
- Family: Fabaceae
- Subfamily: Caesalpinioideae
- Clade: Mimosoid clade
- Genus: Mimosa
- Species: M. borealis

Binomial name
- Mimosa borealis A.Gray

Synonyms
- Mimosa fragrans A.Gray

= Mimosa borealis =

Species of flowering plant

Mimosa borealis, the fragrant mimosa or pink mimosa, is a plant in the family Fabaceae. It is found from Oklahoma to Kansas and south-eastern Colorado, south through central and western Texas and New Mexico to Mexico. The habitat consists of rocky hills, canyons and brushy areas. The plant has a height around 3 feet (90 cm). The flowering phase of the plant is between spring to summer.
