= Aneflus rugicollis =

Scientific classification
- Domain: Eukaryota
- Kingdom: Animalia
- Phylum: Arthropoda
- Class: Insecta
- Order: Coleoptera
- Suborder: Polyphaga
- Infraorder: Cucujiformia
- Family: Cerambycidae
- Genus: Aneflus
- Species: A. rugicollis

Binomial name
- Aneflus rugicollis Linsley, 1935

Species of beetle

Aneflus rugicollis is a species of beetle in the family Cerambycidae. It was described by Linsley in 1935.
