= Aneflus bullocki =

Scientific classification
- Domain: Eukaryota
- Kingdom: Animalia
- Phylum: Arthropoda
- Class: Insecta
- Order: Coleoptera
- Suborder: Polyphaga
- Infraorder: Cucujiformia
- Family: Cerambycidae
- Genus: Aneflus
- Species: A. bullocki

Binomial name
- Aneflus bullocki Chemsak & Giesbert, 1986

Species of beetle

Aneflus bullocki is a species of beetle in the family Cerambycidae. It was described by Chemsak and Giesbert in 1986.
