= Aneflus calvatus =

Scientific classification
- Domain: Eukaryota
- Kingdom: Animalia
- Phylum: Arthropoda
- Class: Insecta
- Order: Coleoptera
- Suborder: Polyphaga
- Infraorder: Cucujiformia
- Family: Cerambycidae
- Genus: Aneflus
- Species: A. calvatus

Binomial name
- Aneflus calvatus Horn in Leng, 1885

Species of beetle

Aneflus calvatus is a species of beetle in the family Cerambycidae. It was described by Horn in 1885.
