= Mimosa loxensis =

Conservation status
- Endangered (IUCN 3.1)

Scientific classification
- Kingdom: Plantae
- Clade: Tracheophytes
- Clade: Angiosperms
- Clade: Eudicots
- Clade: Rosids
- Order: Fabales
- Family: Fabaceae
- Subfamily: Caesalpinioideae
- Clade: Mimosoid clade
- Genus: Mimosa
- Species: M. loxensis

Binomial name
- Mimosa loxensis Barneby

Species of legume

Mimosa loxensis is a species of plant in the family Fabaceae. It is found only in Ecuador. Its natural habitat is subtropical or tropical dry shrubland.
