= Aneflus obscurus =

Scientific classification
- Domain: Eukaryota
- Kingdom: Animalia
- Phylum: Arthropoda
- Class: Insecta
- Order: Coleoptera
- Suborder: Polyphaga
- Infraorder: Cucujiformia
- Family: Cerambycidae
- Genus: Aneflus
- Species: A. obscurus

Binomial name
- Aneflus obscurus (LeConte, 1873)

Synonyms
- Axestinus obscurus LeConte, 1873

Species of beetle

Aneflus obscurus is a species of beetle in the family Cerambycidae. It was described by John Lawrence LeConte in 1873.
