= Aneflus planus =

Scientific classification
- Domain: Eukaryota
- Kingdom: Animalia
- Phylum: Arthropoda
- Class: Insecta
- Order: Coleoptera
- Suborder: Polyphaga
- Infraorder: Cucujiformia
- Family: Cerambycidae
- Genus: Aneflus
- Species: A. planus

Binomial name
- Aneflus planus Franz, 1954

Species of beetle

Aneflus planus is a species of beetle in the family Cerambycidae. It was described by Franz in 1954.
