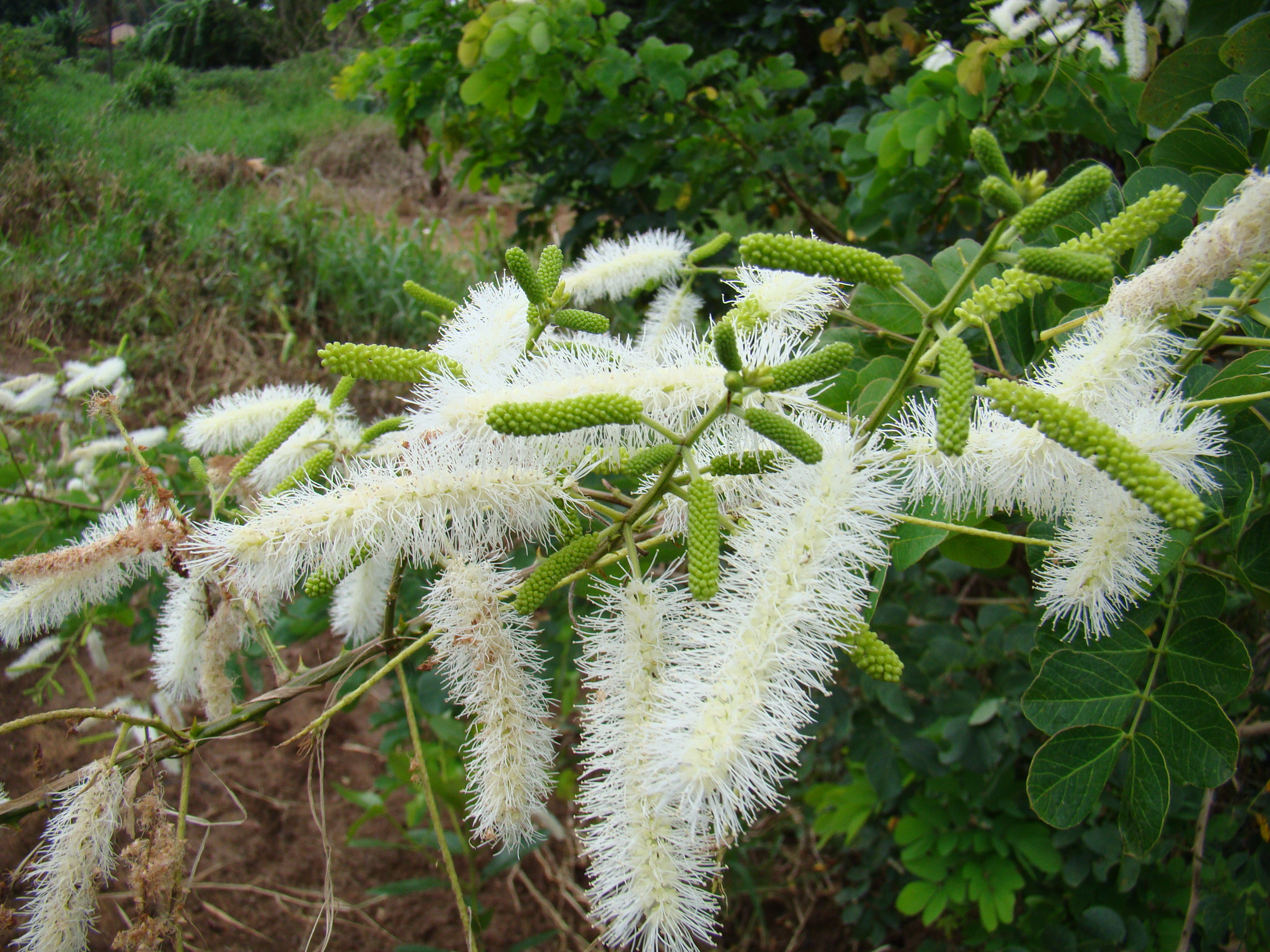

Conservation status
- Least Concern (IUCN 3.1)

Scientific classification
- Kingdom: Plantae
- Clade: Tracheophytes
- Clade: Angiosperms
- Clade: Eudicots
- Clade: Rosids
- Order: Fabales
- Family: Fabaceae
- Subfamily: Caesalpinioideae
- Clade: Mimosoid clade
- Genus: Mimosa
- Species: M. caesalpiniifolia

Binomial name
- Mimosa caesalpiniifolia Benth.

= Mimosa caesalpiniifolia =

Species of legume

Mimosa caesalpiniifolia, commonly known as sabiá in Spanish and as sansão-do-campo or unha-de-gato in Portuguese, is a species of tree in the family Fabaceae. It is native to Brazil.
