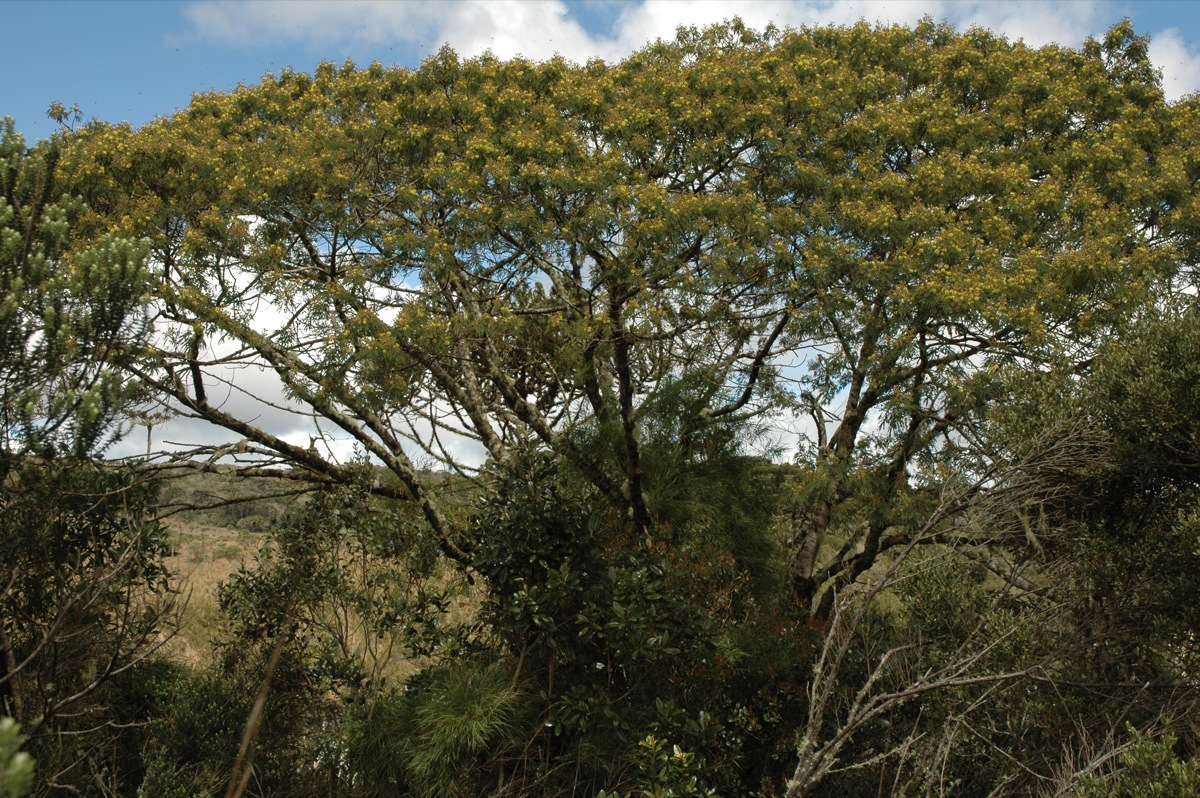

Scientific classification
- Kingdom: Plantae
- Clade: Tracheophytes
- Clade: Angiosperms
- Clade: Eudicots
- Clade: Rosids
- Order: Fabales
- Family: Fabaceae
- Subfamily: Caesalpinioideae
- Clade: Mimosoid clade
- Genus: Mimosa
- Species: M. scabrella

Binomial name
- Mimosa scabrella Benth.

Synonyms
- Mimosa bracaatinga Hoehne

= Mimosa scabrella =

Species of plant

Mimosa scabrella is a tree in the family Fabaceae. It is very fast-growing and it can reach a height of 15 m (49 ft) tall in only 3 years. Its trunk is about 0.1–0.5 m (3.9–19.7 in) in diameter. It has yellow flowers.

== Biology ==
Mimosa scabrella (Bracatinga) is a tree in the subfamily Mimosoideae of the family Fabaceae. It is a cross-pollinating, mostly tetraploid plant with 52 chromosomes.

Mimosa scabrella is native to the southern region of Brazil. There it grows naturally in associations called “Bracatingais”. The Cerrado zone is a centre of biodiversity of Mimosa, where about one quarter of all Mimosa species are found. However M. scabrella evolved to grow in colder humid climate south from this region, in a sub-type of Atlantic Forest, called "mixed ombrophilous forest" (also known as Araucaria moist forests).

It is one of the fastest growing trees in the world. Within 14 months Mimosa scabrella grows up to 5 m (16 ft), in 2 years it reaches 8–9 m (26–30 ft), and in 3 years it can grow to a height of 15 m (49 ft).

=== Characterization ===
The plant is characterized by quick growth, with a lean trunk of around 10–50 cm (3.9–19.7 in) in diameter. The leaves are bi-pinnate. Each leaf has several pinna, which again have 15–31 pairs of pinnules. The upper side of the leaves is yellow-green coloured with a paler underneath.

The flowers with ovary, narrow and slender pistils are ordered in clusters of 1–3 at the leaf bases. They are colored in a whitish to yellow color. Split-open pods are flattened, 2–4 mm (0.079–0.157 in) wide and 5–9 mm (0.20–0.35 in) long. They are covered with tiny warts and separated into 2–4 segments. Each segment is 4-angeled and 1-seeded. The seeds are little, brown, beanlike and about 3–6 mm (0.12–0.24 in) long. The dominant reproductive system is an allogamy (cross-pollinating) system. The reproductive age of M. scabrella is reached after around 3 years.

== Uses ==
Because of the abundant flowering and presence of honeydew caused by Cochineal infestation in some altitudes the tree has an important place in honey production, especially in Brazil. Its wood is suitable for firewood and can also be used as lumber. Before the advent of the diesel locomotive, M. scabrella wood was grown to fuel railroads in parts of Brazil. The long fibres are used for paper production.

In agroforestry M. scabrella shades coffee plants. It is also used in intercropping systems in association with maize and beans. Because M. scabrella is a legume tree it doesn't need fertilization and with the decomposition of the leaves, large amounts of nitrogen become available for other plants. Because M. scabrella has beautiful “feather” leaves, it is often used as an ornamental tree or live fence.

Because of its fast growth its often used for reforestation management.

== Alkaloids ==
Mimosa scabrella contains the alkaloids tryptamine, N-methyltryptamine (NMT), dimethyltryptamine (DMT), and N-methyltetrahydrocarboline in its bark.

== Cultivation ==
Mimosa scabrella can be grown at altitudes of 200–2,400 m (660–7,870 ft) with an annual mean temperature between 12 and 23 °C (54 and 73 °F). The annual precipitation should reach from 600 to 3,500 mm (24 to 138 in). The soil should be well drained. Acid soils with pH as low as 4.8 and soils with high aluminum content are tolerated. Waterlogged, compacted or severely degraded soils are not suitable for M. scabrella. Dry periods of up to four months can be tolerated. Mimosa scabrella is susceptible to strong winds.

Although M. scabrella is native to Brazil, it is cultivated in many South American, some African and South European countries. In its native range, some 28 species of insects are reported to attack M. scabrella.

== See also ==
- Reforestation
