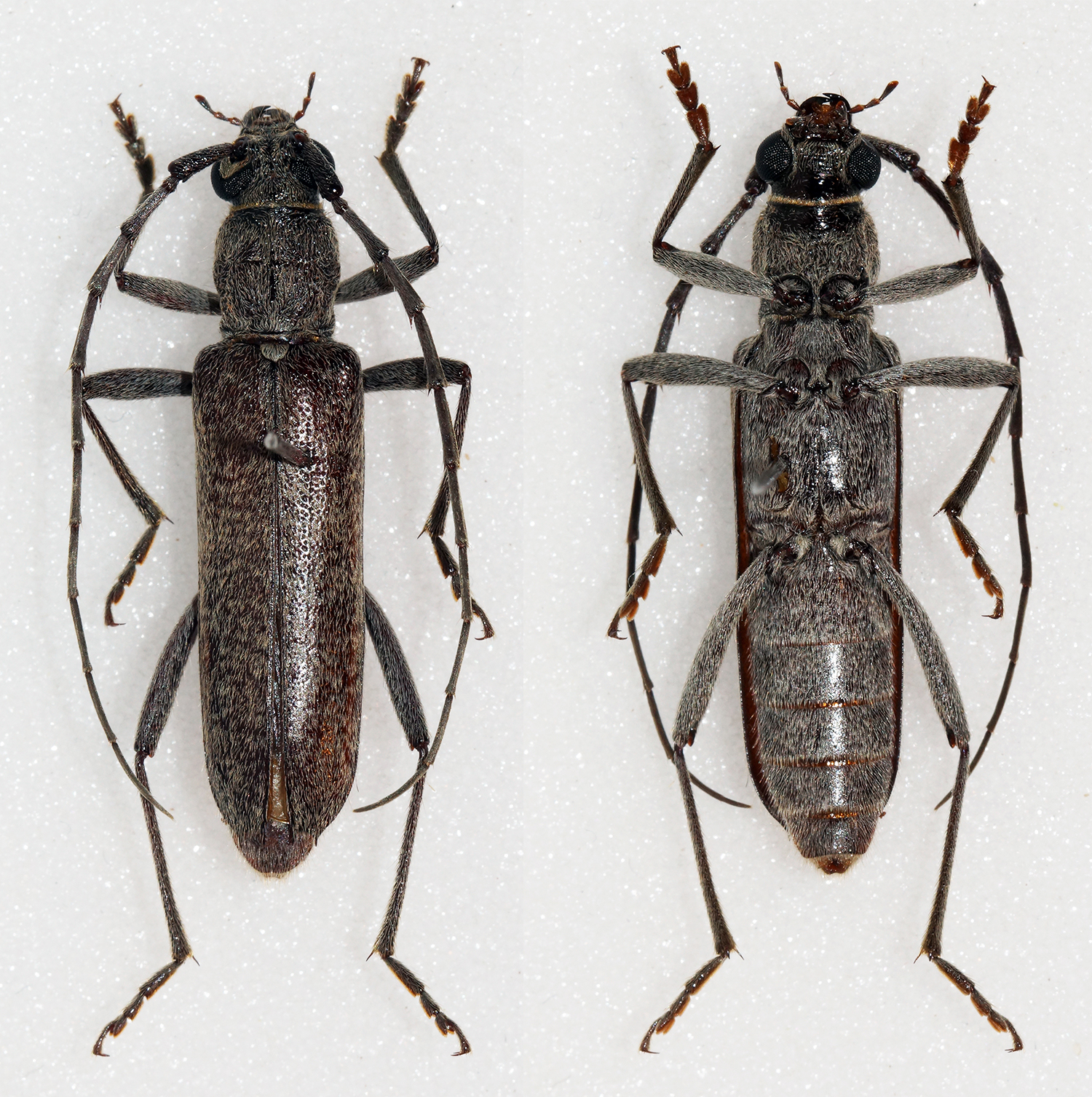
- Size: 26.2mm

Scientific classification
- Domain: Eukaryota
- Kingdom: Animalia
- Phylum: Arthropoda
- Class: Insecta
- Order: Coleoptera
- Suborder: Polyphaga
- Infraorder: Cucujiformia
- Family: Cerambycidae
- Tribe: Elaphidiini
- Genus: Aneflus

= Aneflus =

Genus of beetles

Aneflus is a genus of beetles in the family Cerambycidae, containing the following species:

- Aneflus basicornis Linsley, 1936
- Aneflus bullocki Chemsak & Giesbert, 1986
- Aneflus calvatus Horn in Leng, 1885
- Aneflus cylindricollis Bates, 1892
- Aneflus glabropunctatus Chemsak & Linsley, 1963
- Aneflus humeralis Chemsak & Linsley, 1963
- Aneflus levettei (Casey, 1891)
- Aneflus longissimus (Bates, 1885)
- Aneflus maryannae Chemsak & Linsley, 1968
- Aneflus minutivestis Chemsak & Linsley, 1963
- Aneflus nivarius Chemsak & Linsley, 1963
- Aneflus obscurus (LeConte, 1873)
- Aneflus paracalvatus Knull, 1955
- Aneflus pilosicornis Chemsak & Linsley, 1965
- Aneflus planus Franz, 1954
- Aneflus poriferus Giesbert, 1993
- Aneflus prolixus LeConte, 1873
- Aneflus protensus (LeConte, 1858)
- Aneflus pubescens (Linsley, 1934)
- Aneflus rugicollis Linsley, 1935
- Aneflus sericatus Chemsak & Linsley, 1968
- Aneflus sonoranus Casey, 1924
- Aneflus variegatus Chemsak & Linsley, 1963
- Aneflus zilchi Franz, 1954
