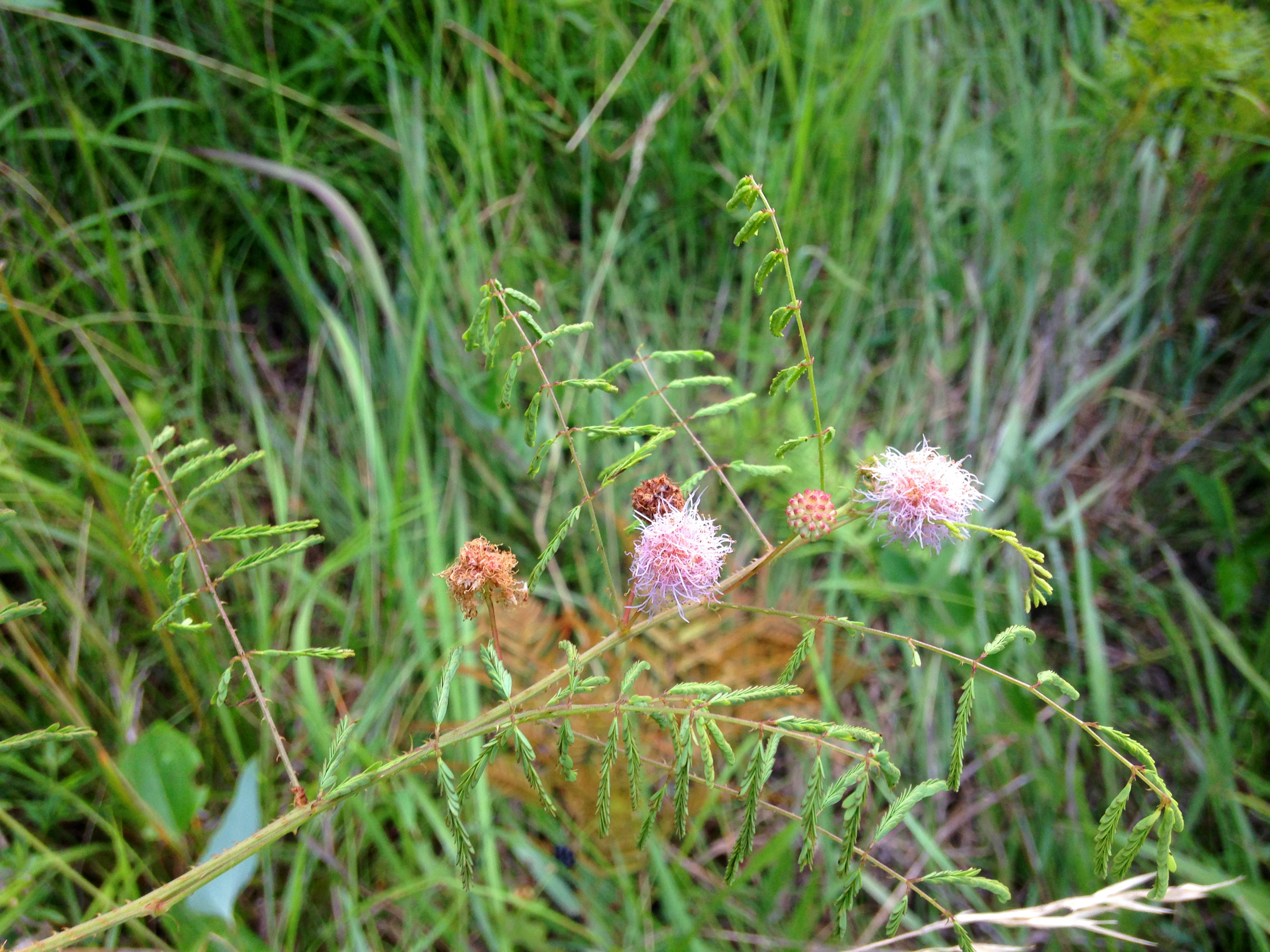

Scientific classification
- Kingdom: Plantae
- Clade: Tracheophytes
- Clade: Angiosperms
- Clade: Eudicots
- Clade: Rosids
- Order: Fabales
- Family: Fabaceae
- Subfamily: Caesalpinioideae
- Clade: Mimosoid clade
- Genus: Mimosa
- Species: M. microphylla

Binomial name
- Mimosa microphylla Dryand.

= Mimosa microphylla =

Species of legume

Mimosa microphylla, commonly called littleleaf sensitive-briar, eastern sensitive-briar, or little leaf mimosa, is a species of flowering plant in the legume family (Fabaceae). It is a perennial herb native to North America, where it is found primarily in the southeastern United States. Its typical natural habitat is in dry woodlands and forests, although it can also be found in disturbed areas.

== Description ==
Mimosa microphylla is a sprawling vine with a prickly stem. It has compound leaves, with 4-8 pairs of small leaflets per leaf. Its leaves are sensitive to touch, and fold together immediately after being disturbed. It produces round heads of purple flowers from June to September.
