= Aneflus maryannae =

Scientific classification
- Domain: Eukaryota
- Kingdom: Animalia
- Phylum: Arthropoda
- Class: Insecta
- Order: Coleoptera
- Suborder: Polyphaga
- Infraorder: Cucujiformia
- Family: Cerambycidae
- Genus: Aneflus
- Species: A. maryannae

Binomial name
- Aneflus maryannae Chemsak & Linsley, 1968

Species of beetle

Aneflus maryannae is a species of beetle in the family Cerambycidae. It was described by Chemsak and Linsley in 1968.
