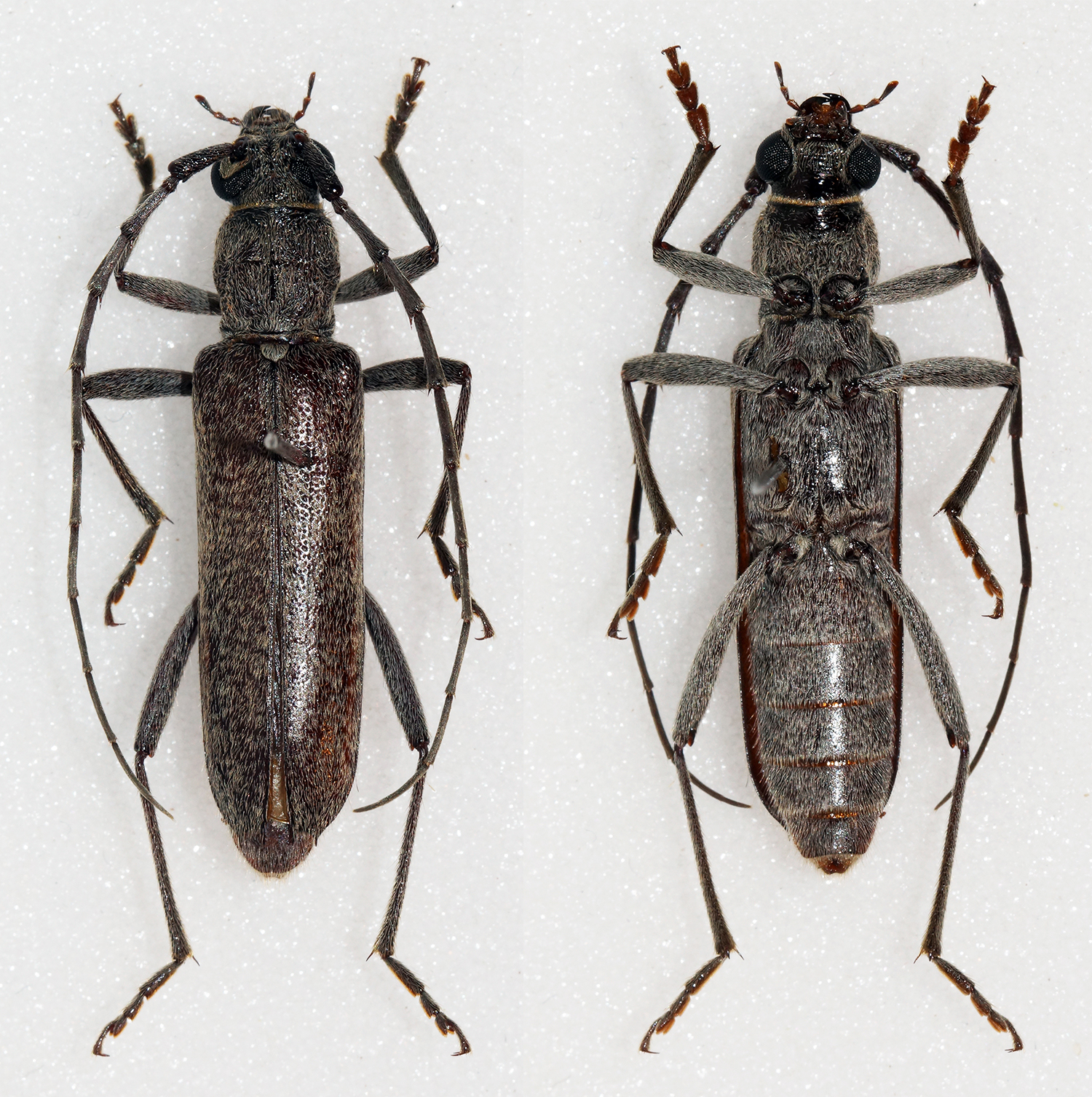

Scientific classification
- Domain: Eukaryota
- Kingdom: Animalia
- Phylum: Arthropoda
- Class: Insecta
- Order: Coleoptera
- Suborder: Polyphaga
- Infraorder: Cucujiformia
- Family: Cerambycidae
- Genus: Aneflus
- Species: A. prolixus

Binomial name
- Aneflus prolixus LeConte, 1873

= Aneflus prolixus =

Species of beetle

Aneflus prolixus is a species of beetle in the family Cerambycidae. It was described by John Lawrence LeConte in 1873.
