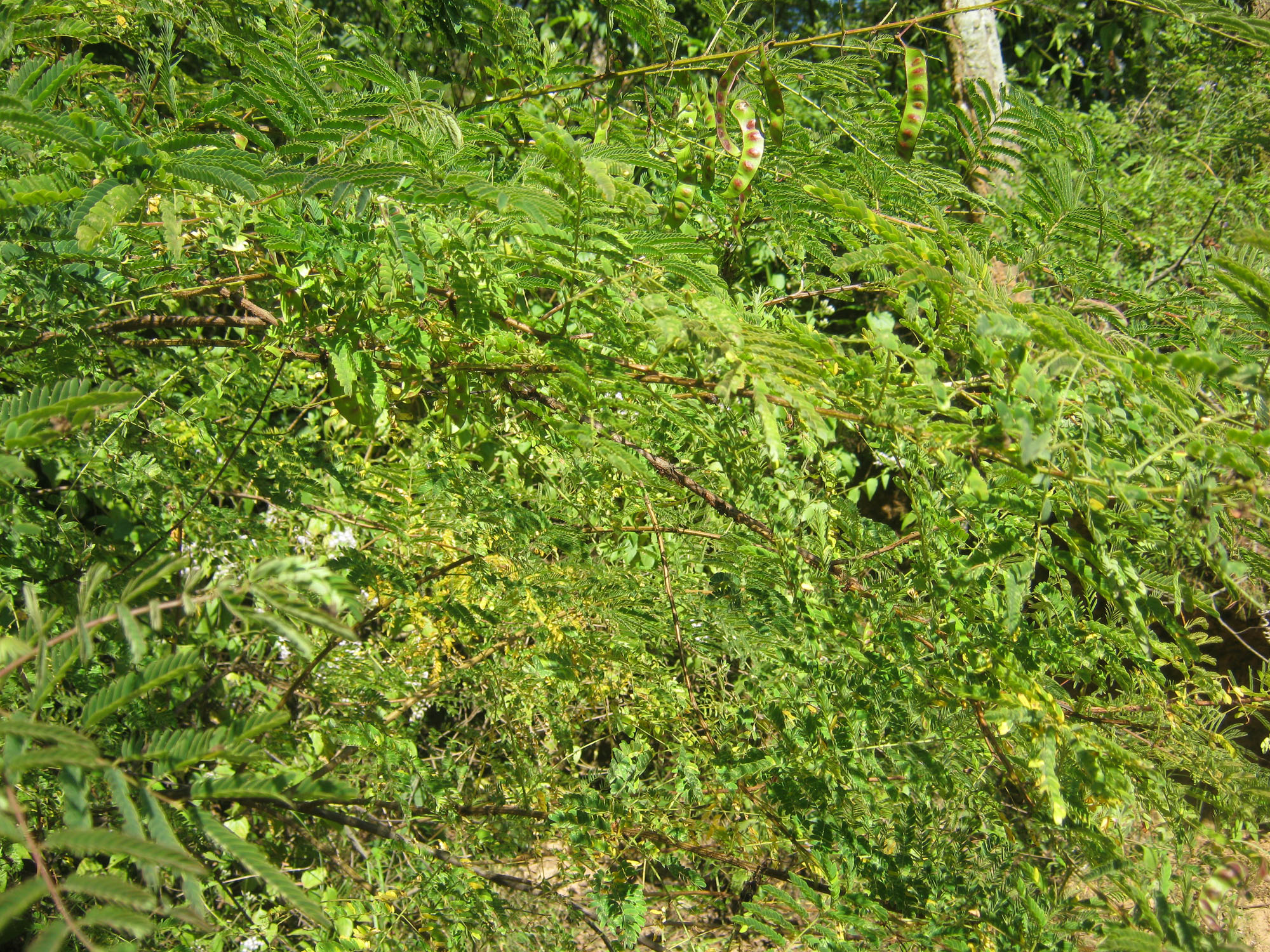
- Mimosa rubicaulis in Panchkhal valley

Scientific classification
- Kingdom: Plantae
- Clade: Tracheophytes
- Clade: Angiosperms
- Clade: Eudicots
- Clade: Rosids
- Order: Fabales
- Family: Fabaceae
- Subfamily: Caesalpinioideae
- Clade: Mimosoid clade
- Genus: Mimosa
- Species: M. rubicaulis

Binomial name
- Mimosa rubicaulis Lam.

Synonyms
- Mimosa octandra Mimosa intsi Mimosa barberi Mimosa himalayana

= Mimosa rubicaulis =

Species of legume

Mimosa rubicaulis is a shrub belonging to the family Fabaceae and subfamily Mimosoideae. It is bipinnately compound, each leaf having 8–12 pairs of pinnae, each with 16–20 pairs of pinnules, unlike Mimosa pudica which has at most two prickly pairs of leaflets. It is found across India.

== Description ==
Mimosa rubicaulis is a large, straggling, very prickly shrub. It flowers from June to September, sporting long clusters of many pink spherical flower heads 1–1.5 cm across. The flowers fade to white, so the clusters sport both pink and white flower-heads most of the time. Leaves are double-compound, 8–15 cm long, with thorny rachis. Leaves have 3–2 pairs of side-stalks, each with 6–15 pairs of tiny oblong leaflets 4–8 mm. Pods are thin, flat, curved, 8–13 cm long, 1 cm wide, breaking into 4–10 rectangular single-seeded units, leaving the remains of the pod attached to the shoot.

It is considered useful for hedges. The wood is suitable for tent pegs and for making gunpowder charcoal. Roots and leaves are used medicinally. Himalayan Mimosa is found in the Himalayas, from Afghanistan to Bhutan, at altitudes of 300–1900 m. It prefers forest edges and boundaries of fields and gardens.
