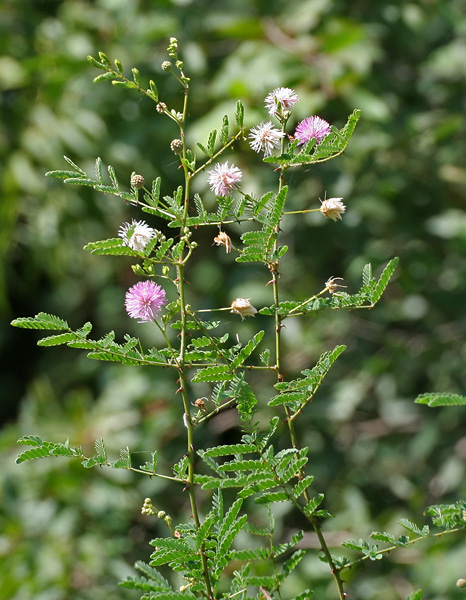

Scientific classification
- Kingdom: Plantae
- Clade: Tracheophytes
- Clade: Angiosperms
- Clade: Eudicots
- Clade: Rosids
- Order: Fabales
- Family: Fabaceae
- Subfamily: Caesalpinioideae
- Clade: Mimosoid clade
- Genus: Mimosa
- Species: M. hamata

Binomial name
- Mimosa hamata Willd.

= Mimosa hamata =

Species of plant

Mimosa hamata (Hindi:Alāy shrub (अलाय) is a species of flowering shrub in the family Fabaceae, that is native to the countries of India and Pakistan.

== Uses ==
This plant has been used for animal feed.

== Gallery ==
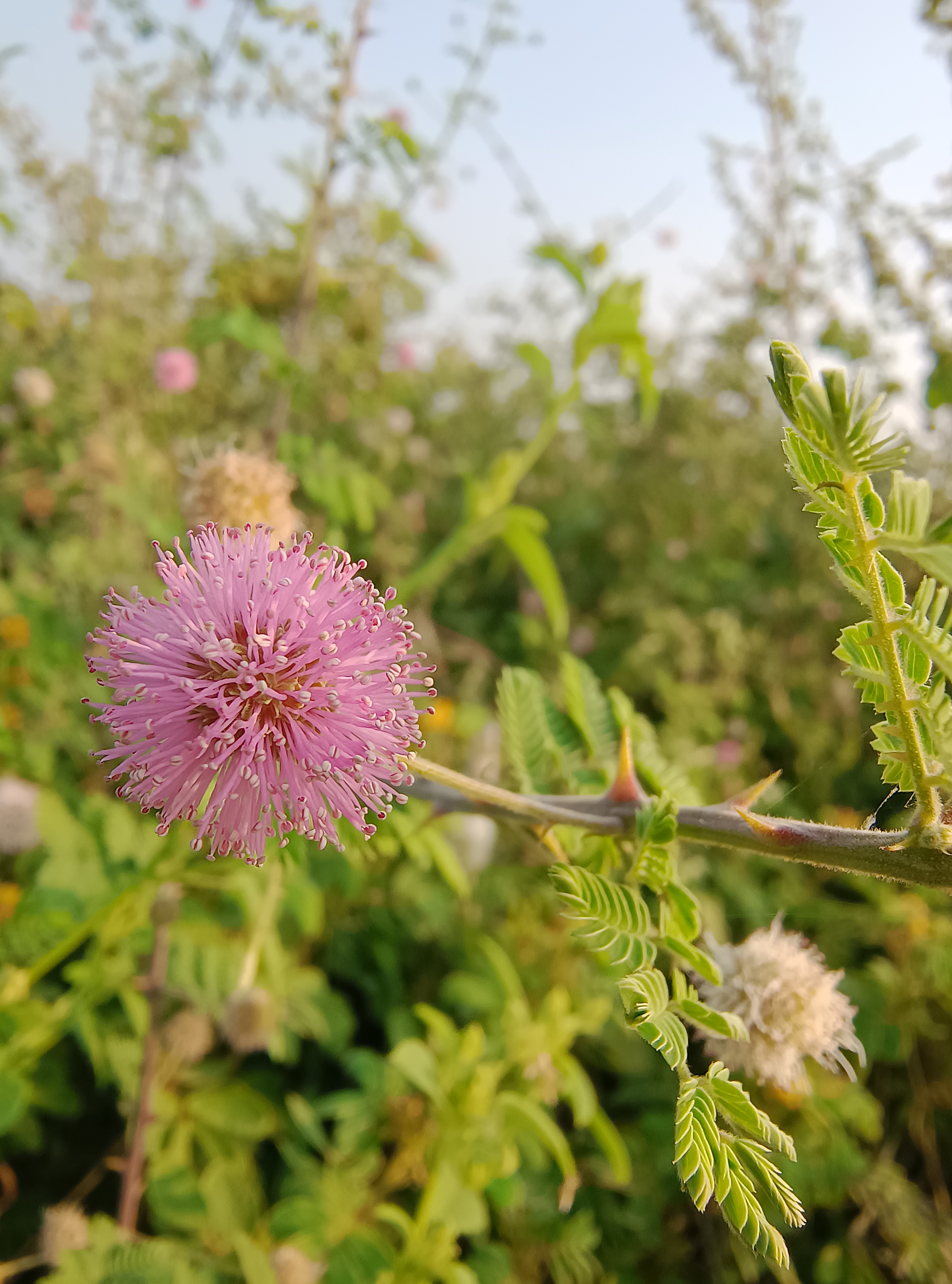
Inflorescence of Mimosa hamata

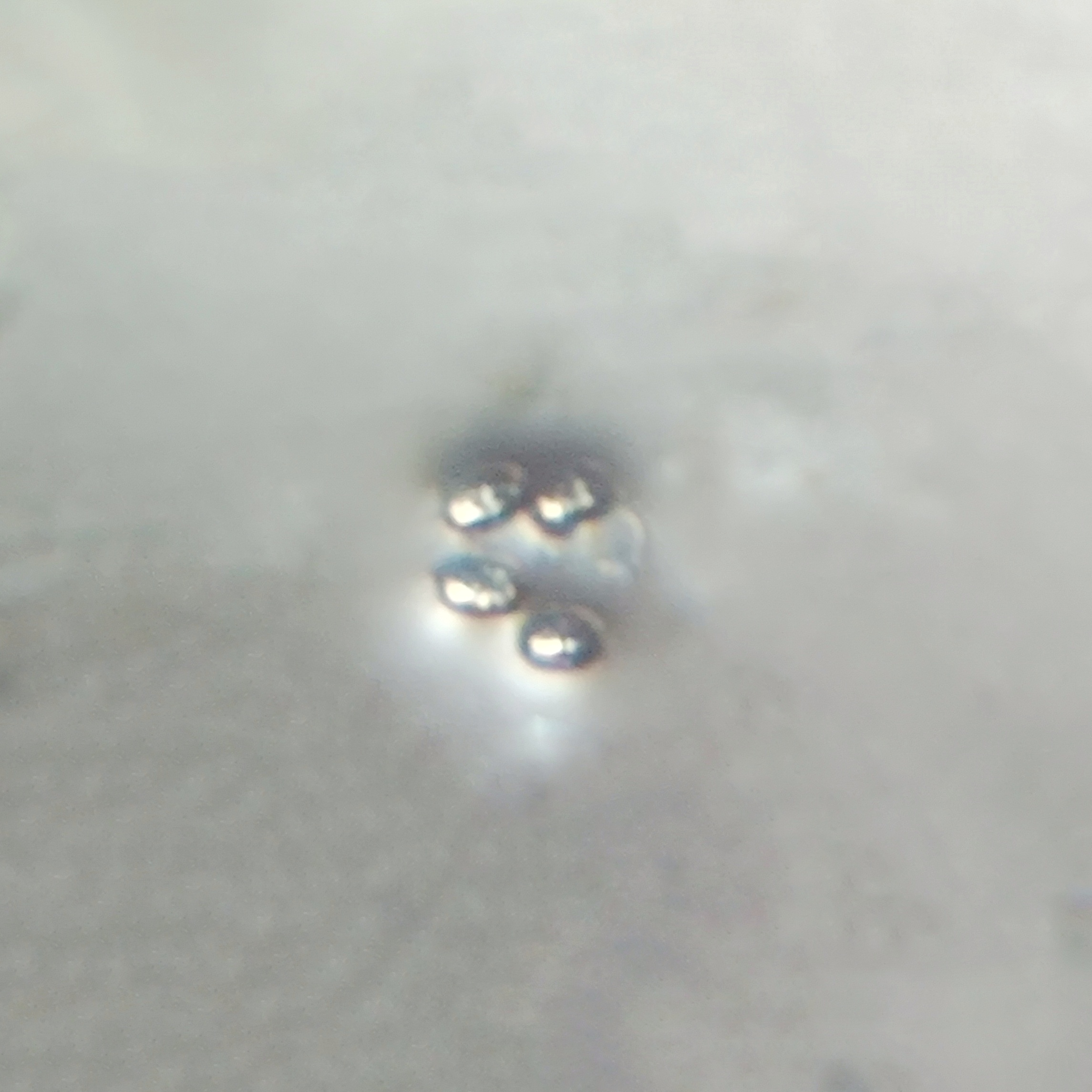
Pollen grains of Mimosa hamata
