= Aneflus sonoranus =

Scientific classification
- Kingdom: Animalia
- Phylum: Arthropoda
- Class: Insecta
- Order: Coleoptera
- Suborder: Polyphaga
- Infraorder: Cucujiformia
- Family: Cerambycidae
- Genus: Aneflus
- Species: A. sonoranus

Binomial name
- Aneflus sonoranus Casey, 1924

Species of beetle

Aneflus sonoranus is a species of beetle in the family Cerambycidae. It was described by Casey in 1924.
