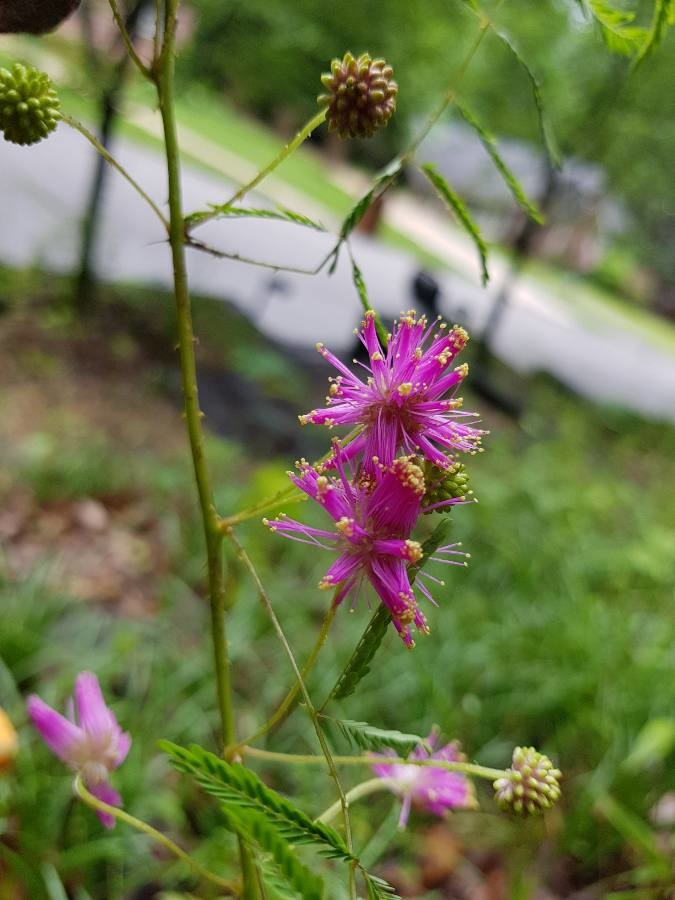

Conservation status
- Secure (NatureServe)

Scientific classification
- Kingdom: Plantae
- Clade: Embryophytes
- Clade: Tracheophytes
- Clade: Spermatophytes
- Clade: Angiosperms
- Clade: Eudicots
- Clade: Rosids
- Order: Fabales
- Family: Fabaceae
- Subfamily: Caesalpinioideae
- Clade: Mimosoid clade
- Genus: Mimosa
- Species: M. quadrivalvis

Binomial name
- Mimosa quadrivalvis L.

Varieties
- M. quadrivalvis var. diffusa (Rose) Beard ex Barneby; M. quadrivalvis var. jaliscensis (J.F.Macbr.) Beard ex Barneby; M. quadrivalvis var. paucijuga (Britton & Rose) Beard ex Barneby; M. quadrivalvis var. quadrivalvis; M. quadrivalvis var. urbaniana Barneby

Synonyms
- List: Leptoglottis quadrivalvis (L.) Britton & Rose; Morongia aculeata A.Heller; Schrankia aculeata Willd.; Schrankia mexicana Raf.; Schrankia quadrivalvis (L.) Merr.

= Mimosa quadrivalvis =

Plant species in the pea family

Mimosa quadrivalvis, known as fourvalve mimosa, sensitive briar and cat's claw, is a trailing vine native to North America, Central America, and the Caribbean. It is known as sensitive briar because the leaves fold when they are touched or disturbed.

== Description ==
It is a sprawling, herbaceous plant with alternate leaves. Each leaf is compound with up to 16 pairs of leaflets that fold together when touched. The stem is covered with small recurved prickles. The flowerheads comprise round clusters of numerous pink flowers, each flower only 3 mm (0.12 in) long with exserted stamens. The fruits are also prickly. Flowering occurs from May through September.

== Varieties ==
Five varieties are accepted.

- Mimosa quadrivalvis var. diffusa (Rose) Beard ex Barneby – western Mexico
- Mimosa quadrivalvis var. jaliscensis (J.F.Macbr.) Beard ex Barneby – southwestern Mexico
- Mimosa quadrivalvis var. paucijuga (Britton & Rose) Beard ex Barneby – northeastern Mexico
- Mimosa quadrivalvis var. quadrivalvis – Mexico (Veracruz) and Belize
- Mimosa quadrivalvis var. urbaniana Barneby – Puerto Rico
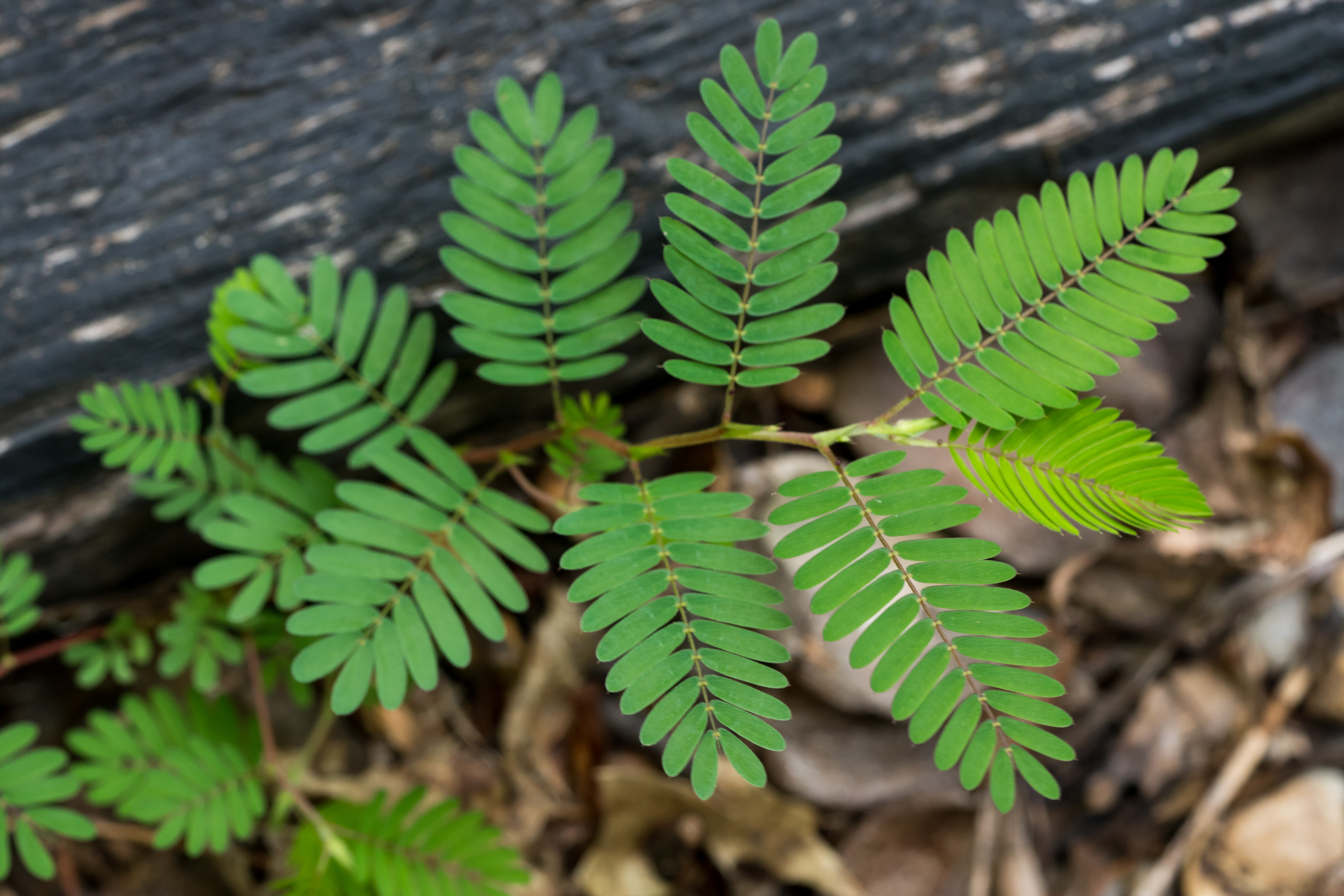
Leaves

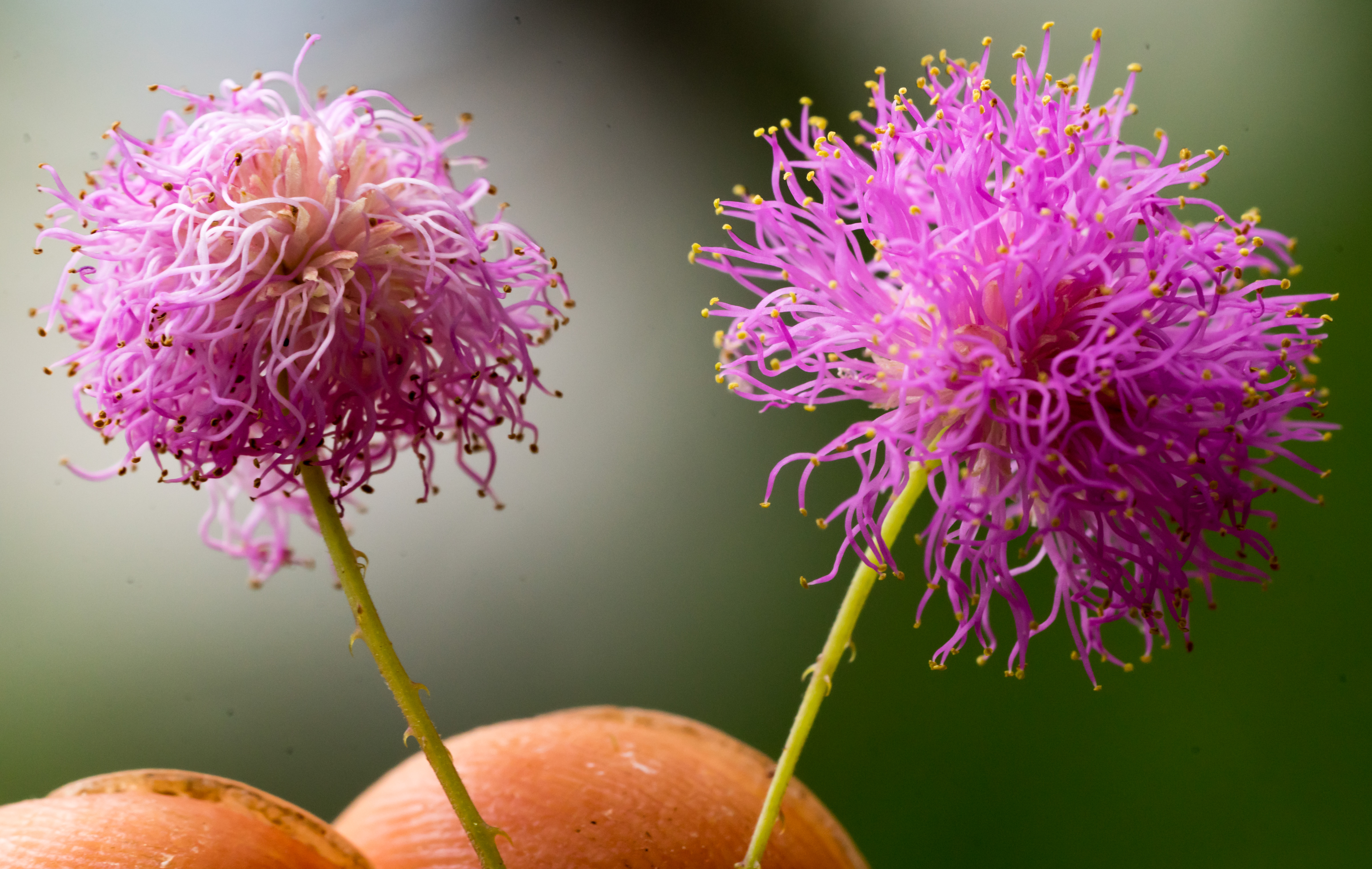
Flowers

== Distribution and habitat ==
Mimosa quadrivalvis is native to Mexico, Belize, and Puerto Rico.

Its habitat includes glades, open woods, thickets, prairies, and roadsides.

== Ecology ==
Mimosa quadrivalvis is insect pollinated and is recorded to have been visited in northern Florida by Agapostemon splendens, Augochloropsis metallica, Augochloropsis sumptuosa, Bombus griseocollis , Ceratina, Halictus poeyi/ligatus, Lasioglossum apopkense, Lasioglossum hitchensi, Lasioglossum illinoense, Lasioglossum imitatum, Lasioglossum pectorale, Lasioglossum reticulatum, Lasioglossum tegulare/puteulanum, Lasioglossum trigeminum, Lasioglossum vierecki, Lasioglossum weemsi/leviense, Melissodes communis.
