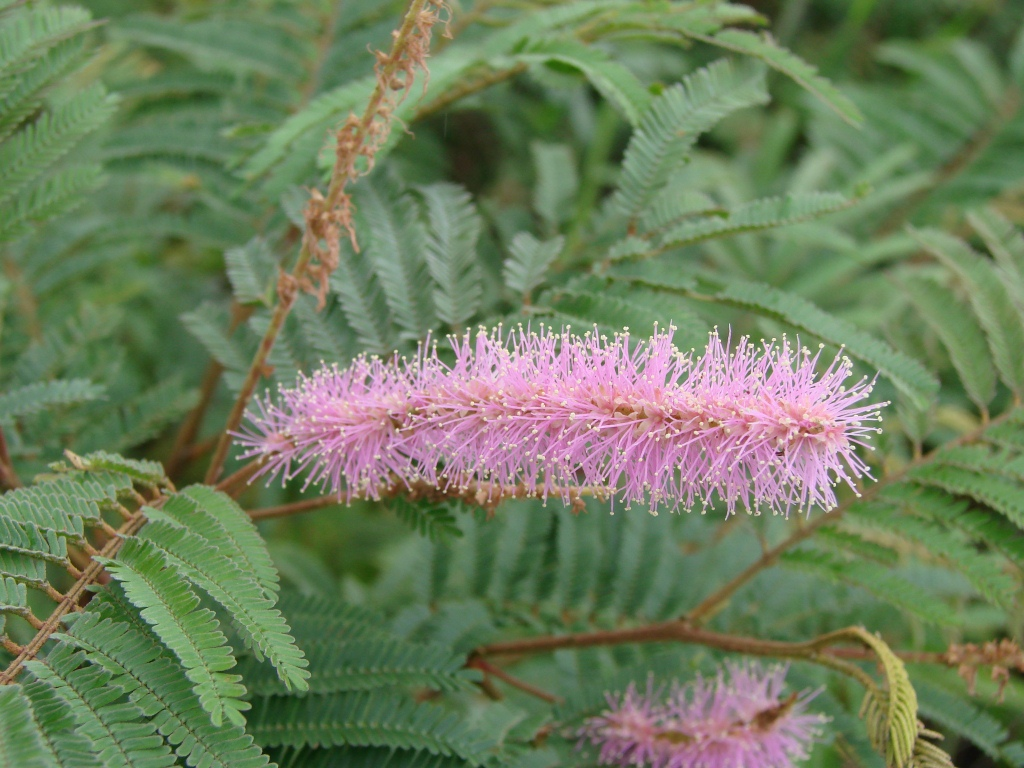

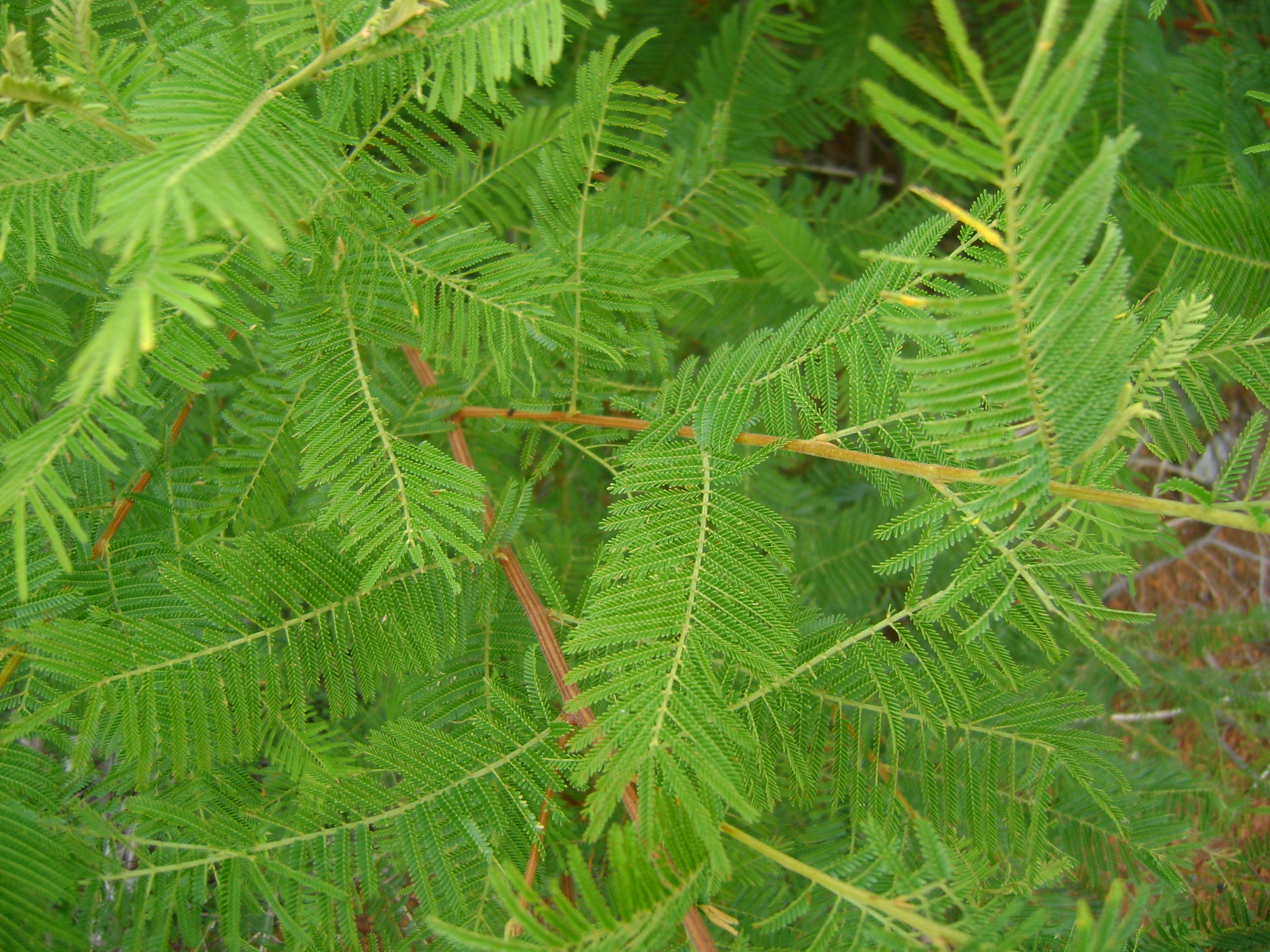

Conservation status
- Near Threatened (IUCN 2.3)

Scientific classification
- Kingdom: Plantae
- Clade: Tracheophytes
- Clade: Angiosperms
- Clade: Eudicots
- Clade: Rosids
- Order: Fabales
- Family: Fabaceae
- Subfamily: Caesalpinioideae
- Clade: Mimosoid clade
- Genus: Mimosa
- Species: M. verrucosa

Binomial name
- Mimosa verrucosa Benth.

= Mimosa verrucosa =

Species of plant

Mimosa verrucosa, commonly known as jurema-branca ("white jurema") or jurema-de-oeiras, is a species of legume of the genus Mimosa, in the common bean family, Fabaceae.

It is a shrub or small tree native to Brazil (Bahia, Ceará, Paraíba, Pernambuco and Rio Grande do Norte). It has "near threatened" conservation status as a result of human‐caused deforestation in arid to semi-arid regions of Northeastern Brazil.

== Growth ==
The tree grows to about 2.5 to 5 m tall and has blossoms that are pink cylindrical spikes. The blossom filaments are pink and the anthers are cream colored.

== Uses ==
The wood of the tree is used for making charcoal, firewood and wooden stakes. The bark is used for medicine.

== Characteristics ==
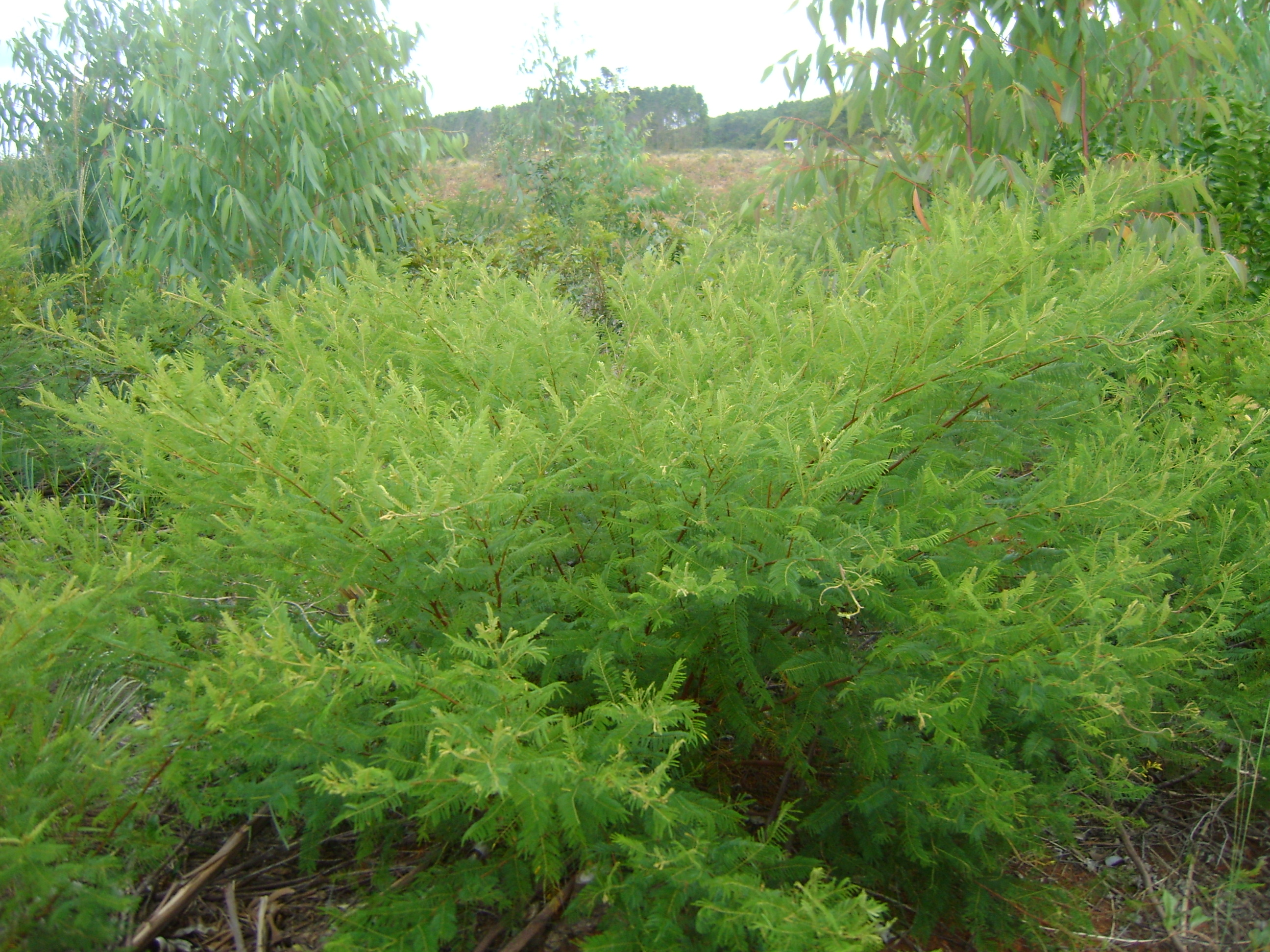
Mimosa vericosa

Mimosa verrucosa has been proven to be a very important provider of pollen for Apis mellifera, the European honey bee.

== Chemical constituent ==
The tree contains the hallucinogen dimethyltryptamine in its root bark.

== See also ==
- Mimosa tenuiflora
- Psychedelic plants
