= Aneflus cylindricollis =

Scientific classification
- Domain: Eukaryota
- Kingdom: Animalia
- Phylum: Arthropoda
- Class: Insecta
- Order: Coleoptera
- Suborder: Polyphaga
- Infraorder: Cucujiformia
- Family: Cerambycidae
- Genus: Aneflus
- Species: A. cylindricollis

Binomial name
- Aneflus cylindricollis Bates, 1892

Species of beetle

Aneflus cylindricollis is a species of beetle in the family Cerambycidae. It was described by Henry Walter Bates in 1892.
