= Mimosa ophthalmocentra =

Scientific classification
- Kingdom: Plantae
- Clade: Tracheophytes
- Clade: Angiosperms
- Clade: Eudicots
- Clade: Rosids
- Order: Fabales
- Family: Fabaceae
- Subfamily: Caesalpinioideae
- Clade: Mimosoid clade
- Genus: Mimosa
- Species: M. ophthalmocentra

Binomial name
- Mimosa ophthalmocentra Mart. ex Benth., 1875

Species of legume

Mimosa ophthalmocentra, or jurema-embira ("red jurema"), is a tree in the family Fabaceae. It is native to Brazil. It is shrub or small tree about 3 to 5 m tall. Its blossoms come in long, narrow cylindrical spikes having yellowish white petals and a white stamen. The blossoms are sometimes found to have a pink tinge. The fruit is green, sometimes with red or purple, flat, about 8 cm long and about 1 cm wide.

The trunk grows to about 20 cm in diameter.

Its wood has a density of about 1.12 g/cm^{3} and it makes good firewood.

== Traditional use ==
Traditionally in northeast Brazil, for cases of cough and bronchitis, a water extract (decoction) of Mimosa ophthalmocentra is made into a drink. A handful of bark in one liter of water is used by itself or in a syrup. The solution is taken until the symptoms subside.
