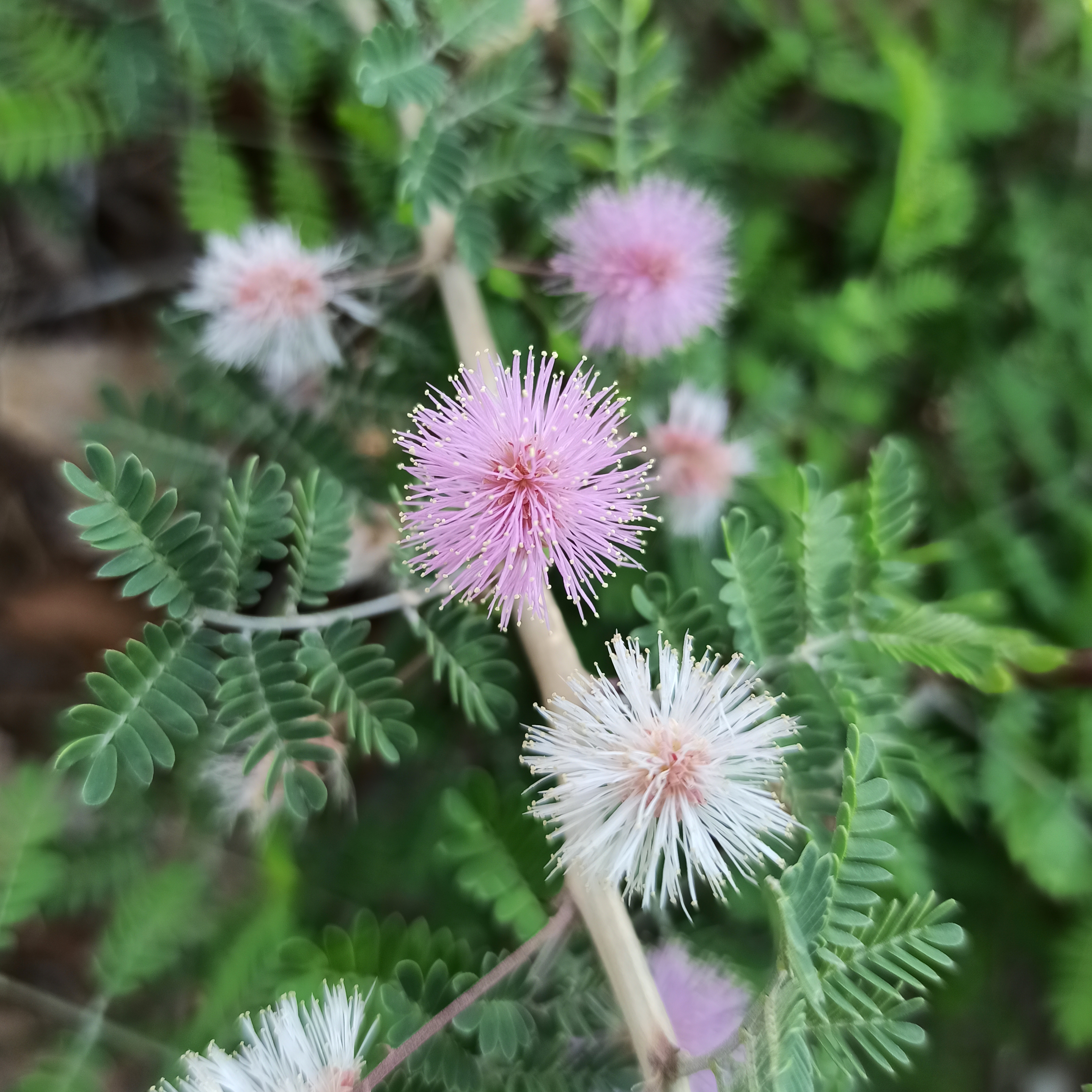
- Catclaw mimosa

Scientific classification
- Kingdom: Plantae
- Clade: Tracheophytes
- Clade: Angiosperms
- Clade: Eudicots
- Clade: Rosids
- Order: Fabales
- Family: Fabaceae
- Subfamily: Caesalpinioideae
- Clade: Mimosoid clade
- Genus: Mimosa
- Species: M. aculeaticarpa

Binomial name
- Mimosa aculeaticarpa Ortega

Synonyms
- Acacia acanthocarpa Willd.; M. acanthocarpa (Willd.) Benth.; M. arida Benth.; M. biuncifera Benth.; M. lindheimeri A. Gray; M. prolifica S.Watson; Mimosopsis biuncifera (Benth.) Britton & Rose; Mimosopsis lindheimeri (A.Gray) Britton & Rose

= Mimosa aculeaticarpa =

Species of plant

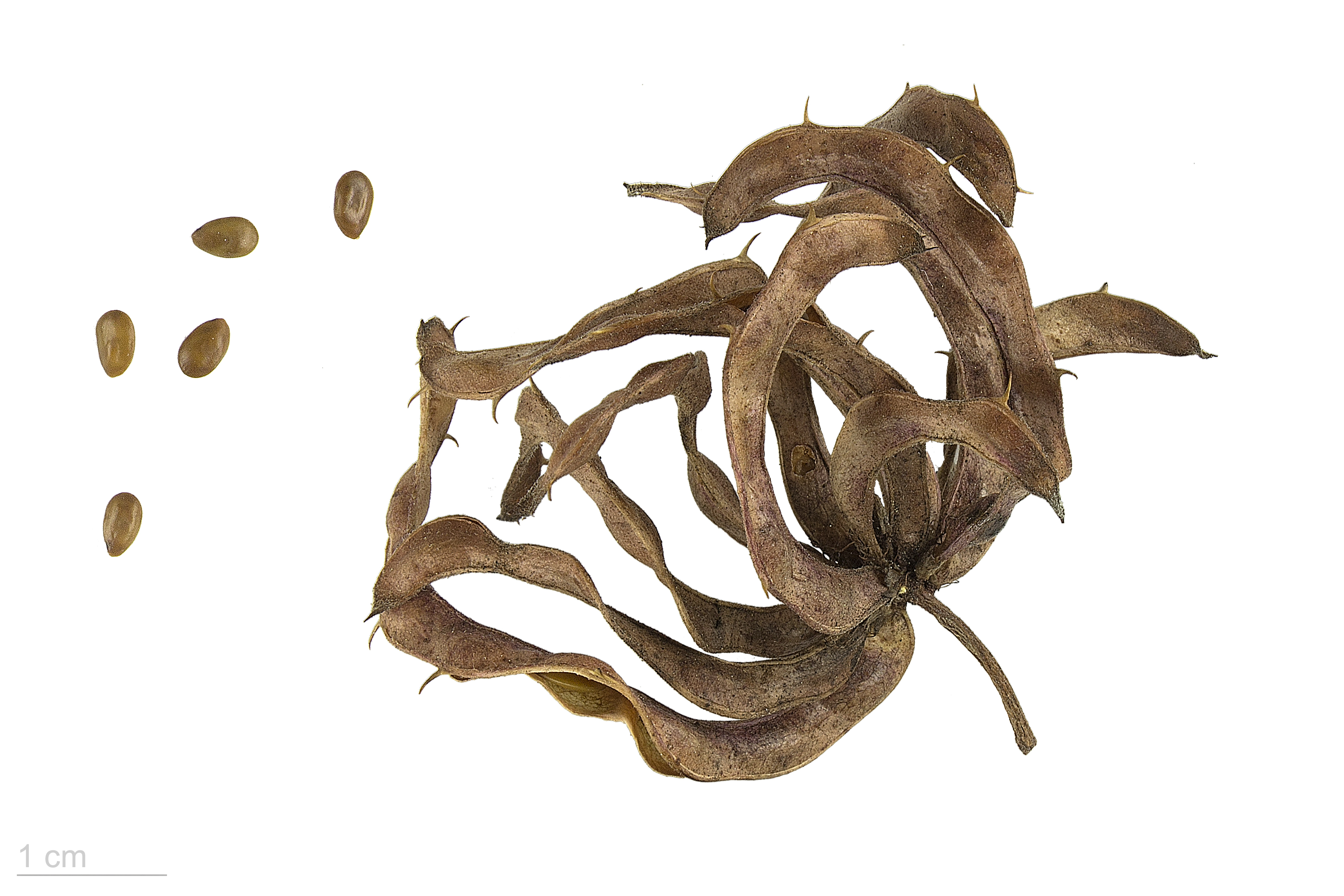
Mimosa aculeaticarpa - MHNT

Mimosa aculeaticarpa is a species of woody shrub in the family Fabaceae. It is commonly known as the catclaw mimosa or the wait-a-minute bush, and is endemic to upland regions of Mexico and the Southwestern United States, particularly Arizona, New Mexico and Texas.

== Description ==
The catclaw mimosa is a straggling thicket forming shrub, usually growing to about one metre tall but occasionally double that height. The twigs are hairy and armed with backward pointing spines that easily catch in clothing. The alternate leaves are bi-pinnate with a varying number of small oblong leaflets. The flowers are white or pale pink, bunched together in globular heads. The fruits are flat pods up to four centimetres long, flattened between the seeds and splitting open when ripe. There are recurved prickles on the edges of the pods.

== Distribution ==
This species grows in upland areas of central and southern Arizona, southern New Mexico, western and central Texas and northern Mexico.

== Ecology ==
This species occurs as scattered individual plants in oak, oak-pine, and evergreen woodlands, pinyon-juniper woodland and mixed with other shrubs in grassland and shrub-steppe communities. It grows on mesas, rocky slopes and gravel deposits. It is commonly found growing in chaparral and is spreading into desert and semi arid areas. This may be because the seed pods are eaten by cattle and the seeds are deposited in the dung, giving them a rich environment for germination. The plant is fire tolerant and sprouts readily after bushfires. In upland areas of west Texas, the redberry juniper (Juniperus pinchotii) acts as a nurse plant for the seedlings. They benefit from the shade and leaf litter associated with the juniper which seems to provide a favourable microclimate for the establishment of the seedlings.
