= Aneflus longissimus =

Scientific classification
- Domain: Eukaryota
- Kingdom: Animalia
- Phylum: Arthropoda
- Class: Insecta
- Order: Coleoptera
- Suborder: Polyphaga
- Infraorder: Cucujiformia
- Family: Cerambycidae
- Genus: Aneflus
- Species: A. longissimus

Binomial name
- Aneflus longissimus (Bates, 1885)

Species of beetle

Aneflus longissimus is a species of beetle in the family Cerambycidae. It was described by Henry Walter Bates in 1885.

The larvae of this beetle usually dwell inside wood, and they can cause damage to logs and other wooden materials.
