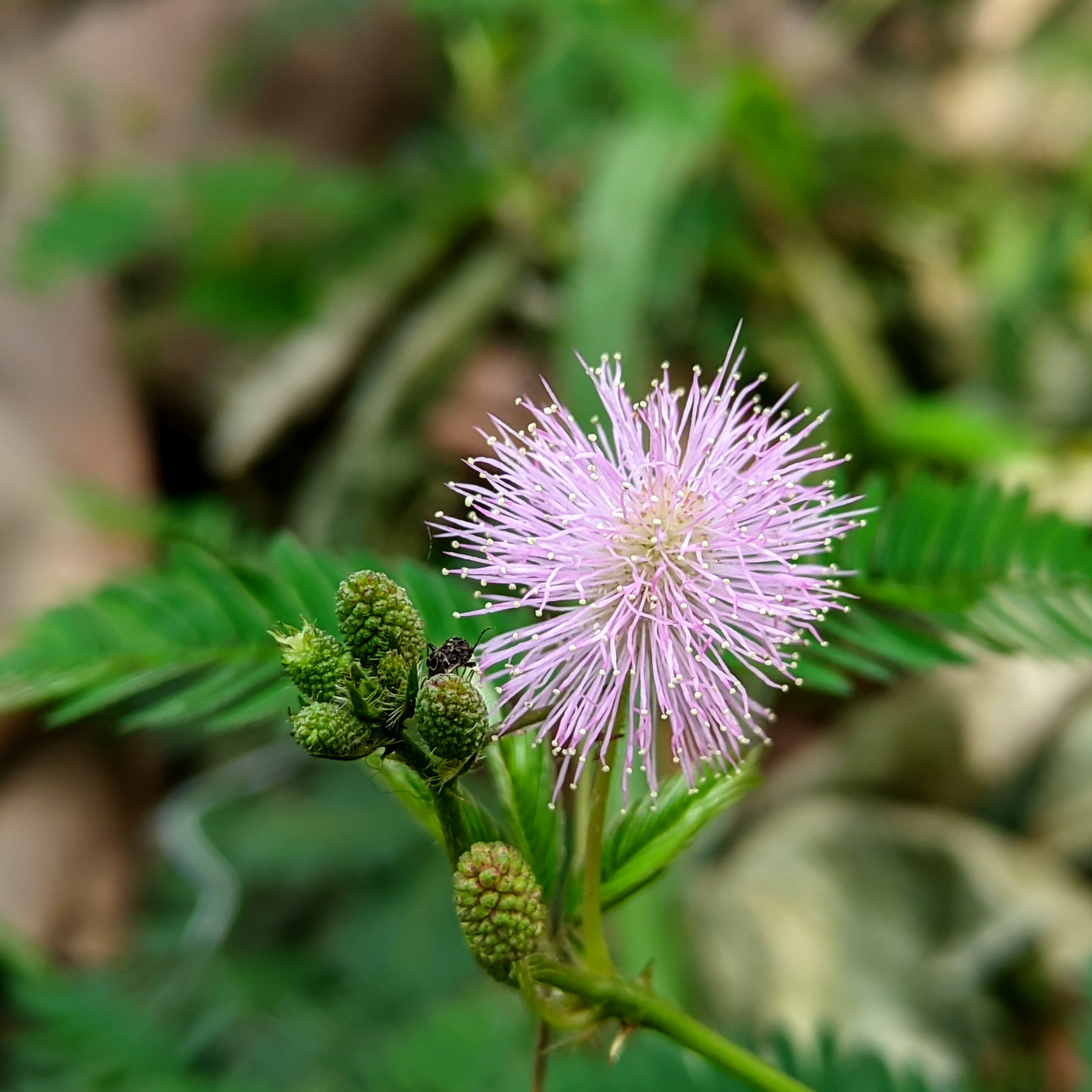
- Mimosa pudica flower heads

Scientific classification
- Kingdom: Plantae
- Clade: Tracheophytes
- Clade: Angiosperms
- Clade: Eudicots
- Clade: Rosids
- Order: Fabales
- Family: Fabaceae
- Subfamily: Caesalpinioideae
- Clade: Mimosoid clade
- Genus: Mimosa; L.

Type species
- Mimosa pudica L.

Species
- About 600 species

Synonyms
- Acanthopteron Britton; Eburnax Raf.; Haitimimosa Britton; Leptoglottis DC. ex Raspail; Lomoplis Raf.; Mimosopsis Britton & Rose; Morongia Britton; Neomimosa Britton & Rose; Pteromimosa Britton; Schranckiastrum Hassl.; Schrankia Willd.; Sensitiva Raf.

= Mimosa =

Mimosa Temporal range: Oligocene–Present

Genus of flowering plants

Mimosa is a genus of about 600 species of herbs and shrubs, in the mimosoid clade of the legume family Fabaceae. Species are native to the Americas, from North Dakota to northern Argentina, and to eastern Africa (Tanzania, Mozambique, and Madagascar) as well as the Indian subcontinent and Indochina. The generic name is derived from the Greek word μῖμος (mimos), 'actor' or 'mime', and the feminine suffix -osa, 'resembling', suggesting its 'sensitive leaves' which seem to 'mimic conscious life'.

Two species in the genus are especially notable. One is Mimosa pudica, commonly known as touch-me-not, which folds its leaves when touched or exposed to heat. It is native to southern Central and South America but is widely cultivated elsewhere for its curiosity value, both as a houseplant in temperate areas, and outdoors in the tropics. Outdoor cultivation has led to weedy invasion in some areas, notably Hawaii. The other is Mimosa tenuiflora, which is best known for its use in shamanic ayahuasca brews due to the psychedelic drug dimethyltryptamine found in its root bark.

== Taxonomy ==
The taxonomy of the genus Mimosa has gone through several periods of splitting and lumping, ultimately accumulating over 3,000 names, many of which have either been synonymized under other species or transferred to other genera. In part due to these changing circumscriptions, the name "Mimosa" has also been applied to several other related species with similar pinnate or bipinnate leaves, but are now classified in other genera. The most common examples of this are Albizia julibrissin (Persian silk tree) and Acacia dealbata (wattle).

== Description ==
Mimosa pudica leaves closing when touched

Members of this genus are among the few plants capable of rapid movement; examples outside of Mimosa include the telegraph plant, Aldrovanda, some species of Drosera and the Venus flytrap. The leaves of the Mimosa pudica close quickly when touched. Some mimosas raise their leaves in the day and lower them at night, and experiments done by Jean-Jacques d'Ortous de Mairan on mimosas in 1729 provided the first evidence of biological clocks.

Mimosa can be distinguished from the large related genera, Acacia and Albizia, since its flowers have ten or fewer stamens. Botanically, what appears to be a single globular flower is actually a cluster of many individual ones. Mimosas contain some level of heptanoic acid.

== Species ==
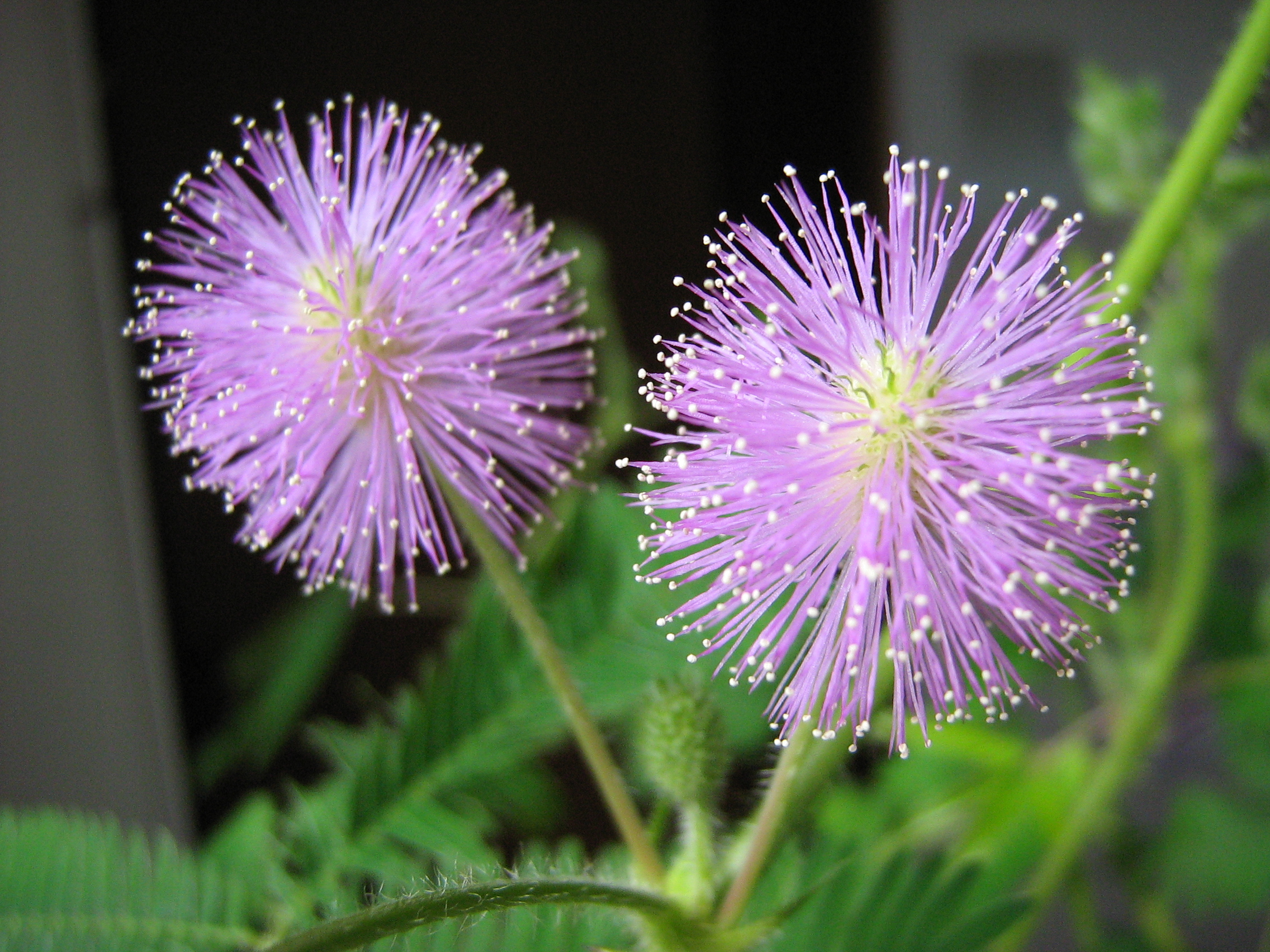
Mimosa pudica

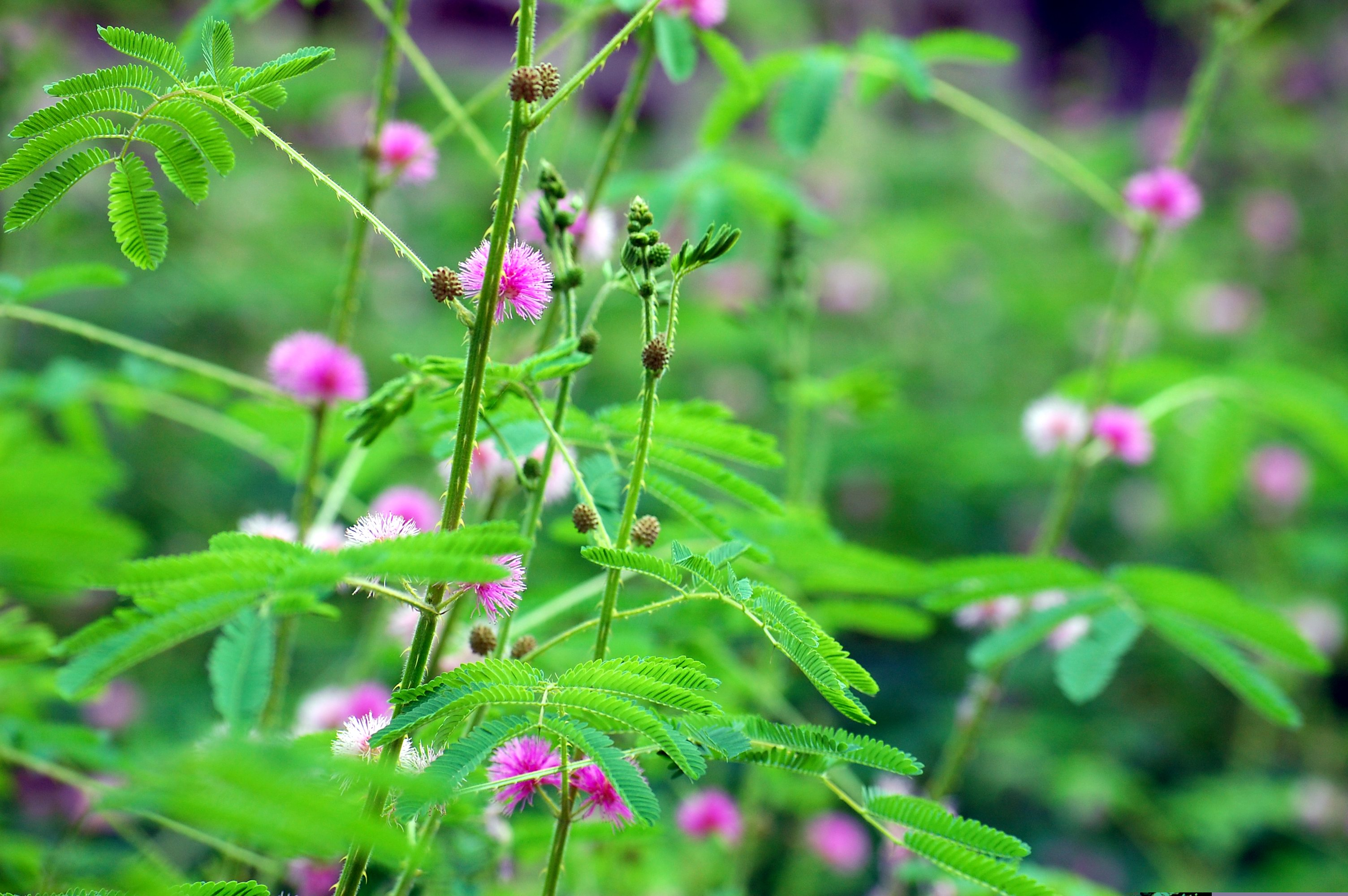
Mimosa diplotricha in Kerala, India

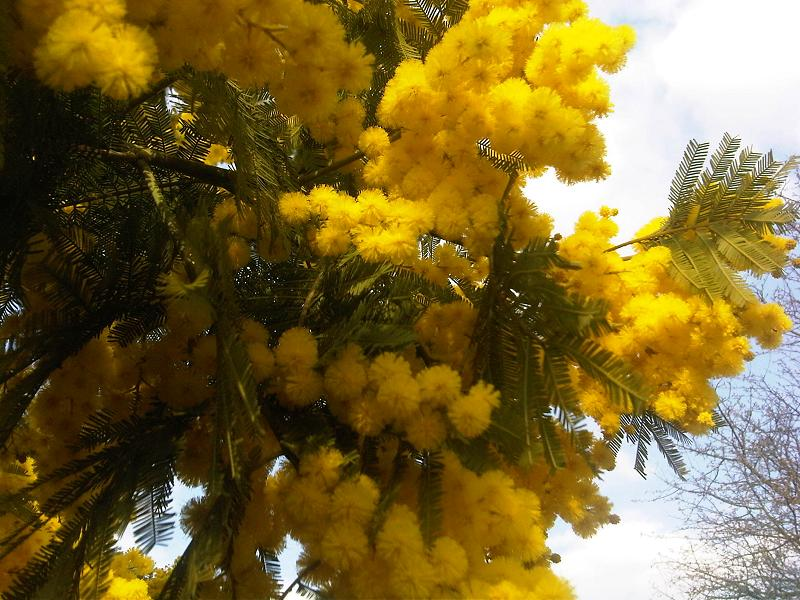
Mimosa scabrella in London

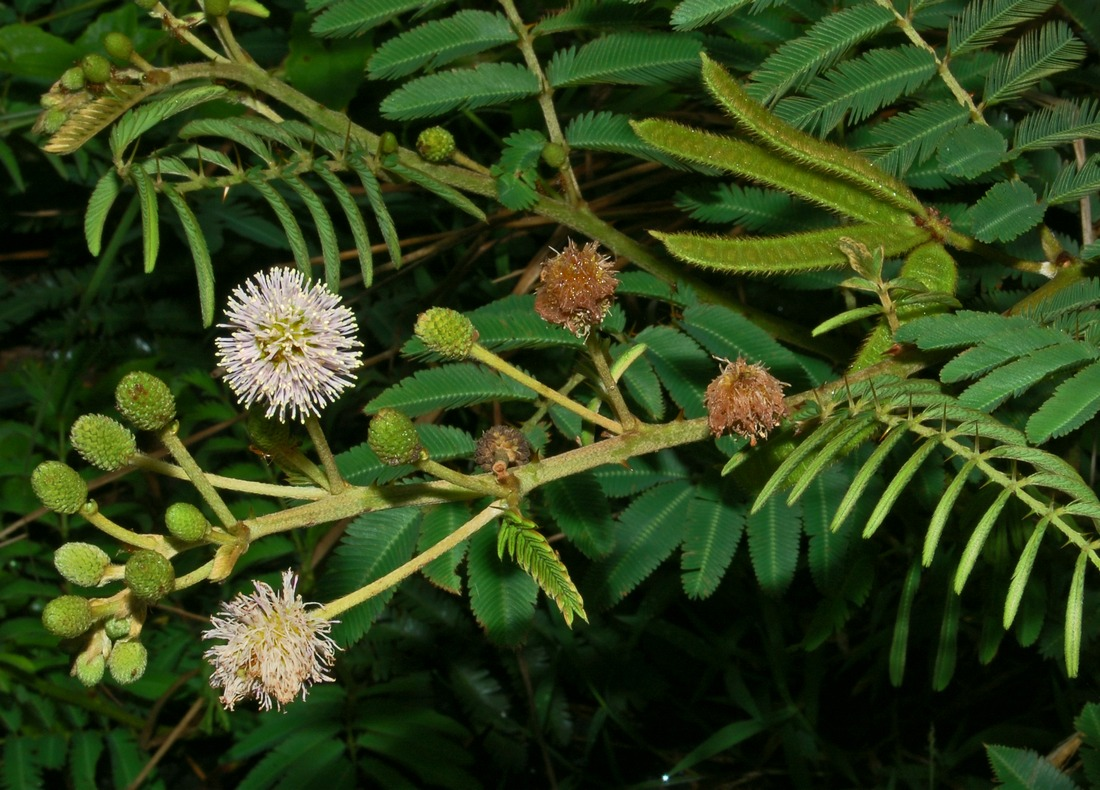
Mimosa pigra in Bogor, West Java, Indonesia

There are about 590 species including:

- Mimosa aculeaticarpa Ortega
- Mimosa andina Benth.
- Mimosa arenosa (Willd.) Poir.
- Mimosa asperata L.
- Mimosa borealis Gray
- Mimosa caesalpiniifolia Benth.
- Mimosa casta L.
- Mimosa cupica Gray
- Mimosa ceratonia L.
- Mimosa diplotricha C.Wright ex Sauvalle
- Mimosa disperma Barneby
- Mimosa distachya Cav.
- Mimosa dysocarpa Benth.
- Mimosa emoryana Benth.
- Mimosa grahamii Gray
- Mimosa hamata Willd.
- Mimosa hystricina (Small ex Britt. et Rose) B.L.Turner
- Mimosa invisa Martius ex Colla
- Mimosa latidens (Small) B.L. Turner
- Mimosa laxiflora Benth.
- Mimosa loxensis Barneby
- Mimosa malacophylla Gray
- Mimosa microphylla Dry.
- Mimosa nothacacia Barneby
- Mimosa nuttallii (DC.) B.L. Turner
- Mimosa ophthalmocentra Mart. ex Benth. 1865
- Mimosa pellita Kunth ex Willd.
- Mimosa pigra L.
- Mimosa polycarpa Kunth
- Mimosa pudica L.
- Mimosa quadrivalvis L.
  - Mimosa quadrivalvis var. hystricina (Small) Barneby
  - Mimosa quadrivalvis var. quadrivalvis L.
- Mimosa roemeriana Scheele
- Mimosa rubicaulis Lam.
- Mimosa rupertiana B.L. Turner
- Mimosa scabrella Benth.
- Mimosa schomburgkii Benth.
- Mimosa somnians Humb. & Bonpl. ex Willd.
- Mimosa strigillosa Torr. et Gray
- Mimosa tenuiflora (Willd.) Poir. (= Mimosa hostilis)
- Mimosa texana (Gray) Small
- Mimosa townsendii Barneby
- Mimosa turneri Barneby
- Mimosa verrucosa Benth.
