= Mimosa invisa =

Scientific classification
- Kingdom: Plantae
- Clade: Tracheophytes
- Clade: Angiosperms
- Clade: Eudicots
- Clade: Rosids
- Order: Fabales
- Family: Fabaceae
- Subfamily: Caesalpinioideae
- Clade: Mimosoid clade
- Genus: Mimosa
- Species: M. invisa

Binomial name
- Mimosa invisa Martius ex Colla

Species of legume

Mimosa invisa is a species of leguminous woody shrub or vine native to South America. Mimosa invisa includes two subspecies, each with two varieties: The species is considered to be noxious and invasive in much of the United States.

- Mimosa invisa Martius ex Colla

- Mimosa invisa invisa Barneby

- Mimosa invisa invisa var. invisa Barneby - native to Brazil and Paraguay
- Mimosa invisa invisa var. macrostachya (Bentham) Barneby - native to Brazil and Paraguay

- Mimosa invisa spiciflora (Karsten) Barneby

- Mimosa invisa spiciflora var. spiciflora Barneby - native to northern South America
- Mimosa invisa spiciflora var. tovarensis (Bentham) Barneby - native to Venezuela
