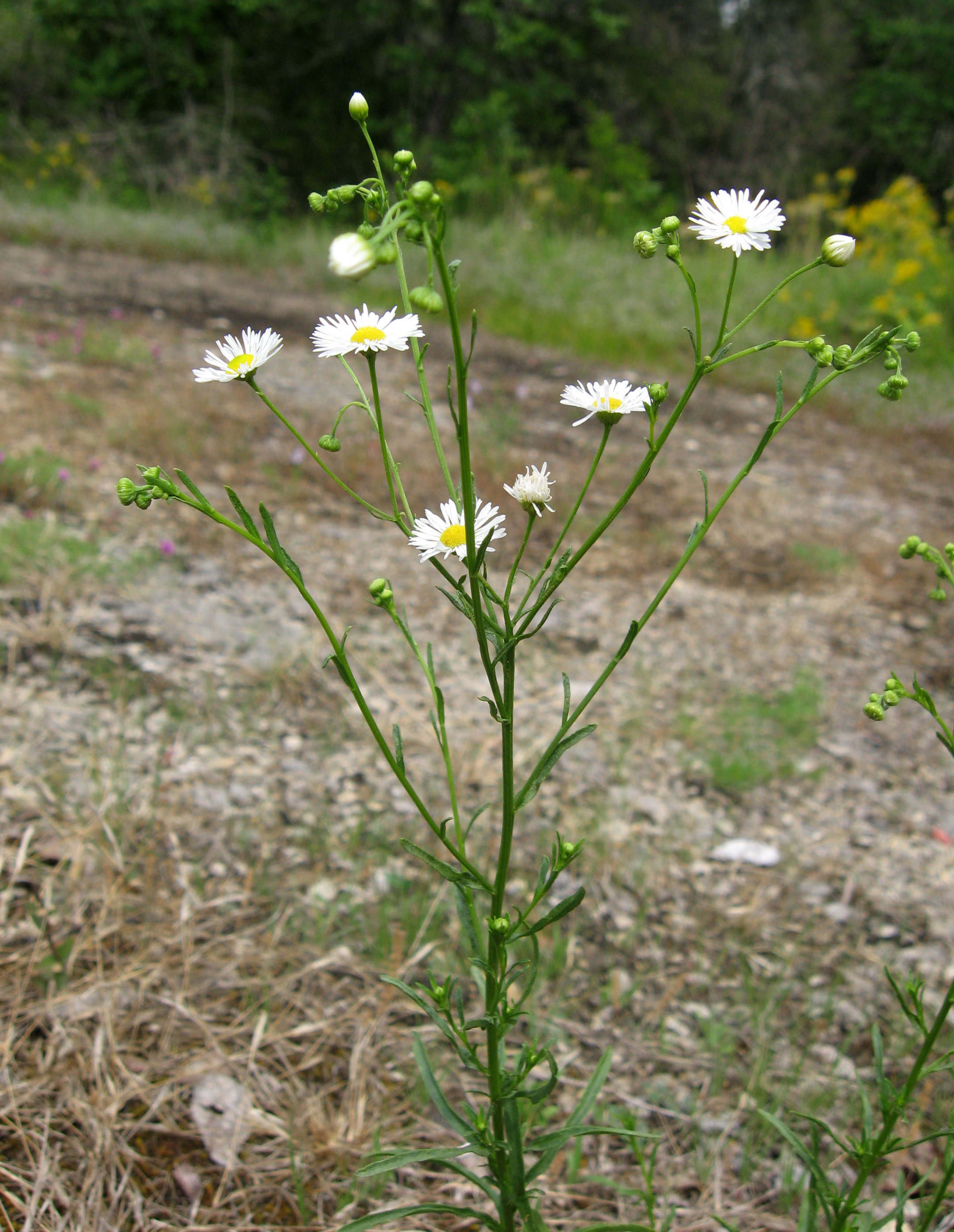
- Cedars of Lebanon State Park, Tennessee

Conservation status
- Secure (NatureServe)

Scientific classification
- Kingdom: Plantae
- Clade: Embryophytes
- Clade: Tracheophytes
- Clade: Angiosperms
- Clade: Eudicots
- Clade: Asterids
- Order: Asterales
- Family: Asteraceae
- Genus: Erigeron
- Species: E. strigosus

Binomial name
- Erigeron strigosus Muhl. ex Willd.

Synonyms
- Synonymy: Erigeron annuus subsp. strigosus (Muhl. ex Willd.) Wagenitz; Erigeron ramosus (Walter) "Britton, Sterns & Poggenb." 1888 not Raf. 1817; Erigeron ramosus var. beyrichii (Fisch. & C.A.Mey.) Trel.; Erigeron strigosus var. beyrichii (Fisch. & C.A.Mey.) Torr. & A.Gray ex A.Gray; Erigeron strigosus var. discoideus A.Gray; Erigeron strigosus var. eligulatus Cronquist; Erigeron traversii Shinners; Phalacroloma strigosum (Muhl. ex Willd.) Tzvelev; Phalacroloma septentrionale (Fernald & Wiegand) Tzvelev; Stenactis beyrichii Fisch. & C.A.Mey.; Stenactis septentrionalis (Fernald & Wiegand) Holub

= Erigeron strigosus =

Species of plant

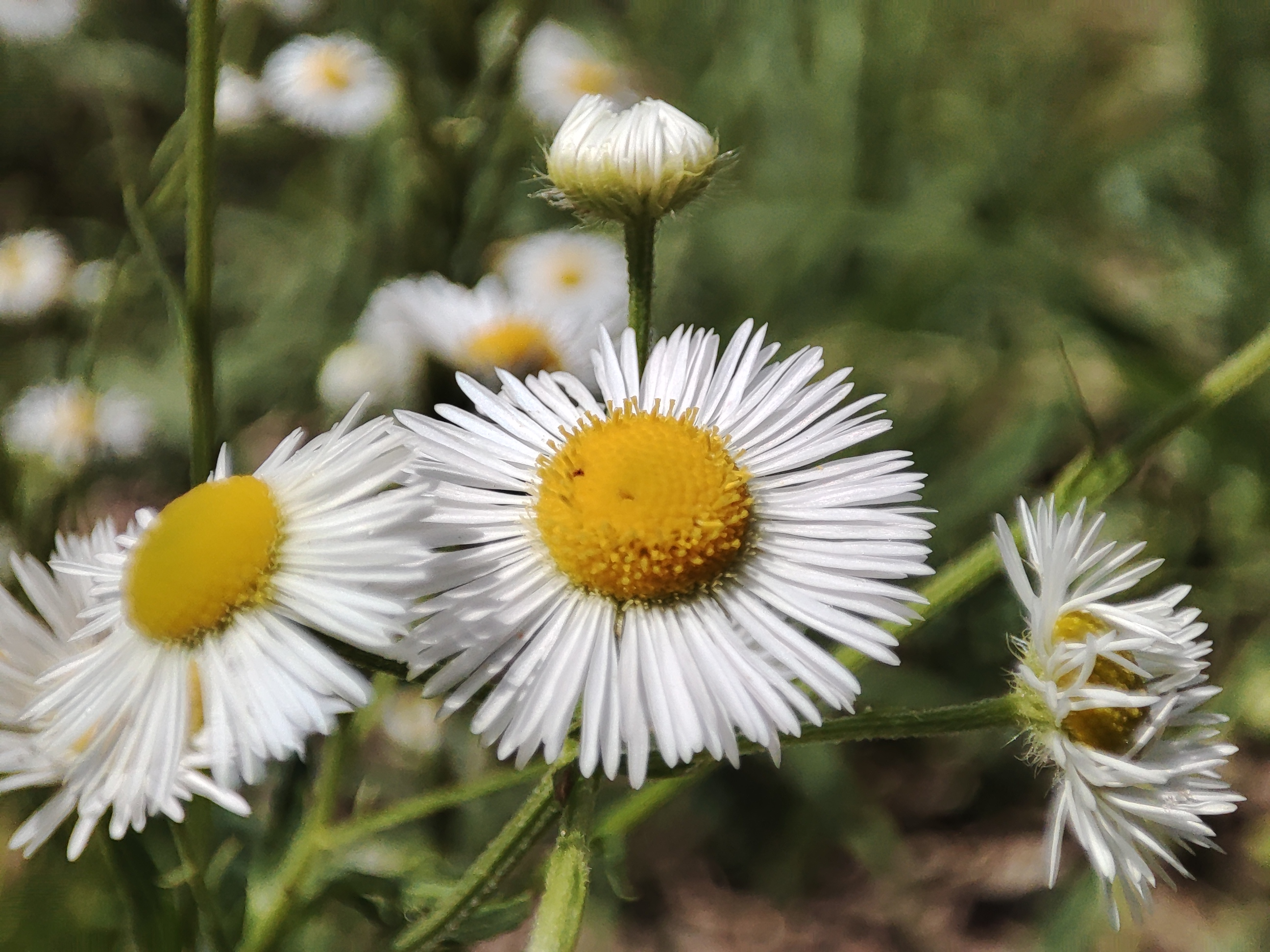
Erigeron strigosus flowers

Erigeron strigosus is a species of flowering plant in the family Asteraceae known by the common names prairie fleabane, common eastern fleabane, and daisy fleabane.

Erigeron strigosus is native to eastern and central North America as far west as Manitoba, Idaho and Texas. It has also become naturalized in western North America as well as in Europe and China as a somewhat weedy naturalized species.

Erigeron strigosus is an annual or biennial herb reaching heights of up to 80 cm (32 inches). It has hairy, petioled, non-clasping, oval-shaped leaves a few centimeters long mostly on the lower part of the plant. One plant can produce as many as 200 flower heads in a spindly array of branching stems. Each head is less than a centimeter (0.4 inches) wide, containing 50–100 white, pink, or blue ray florets surrounding numerous yellow disc florets.

Varieties

- Erigeron strigosus var. calcicola J. R. Allison - Alabama, Georgia, Tennessee
- Erigeron strigosus var. dolomiticola J. R. Allison - Alabama
- Erigeron strigosus var. strigosus - much of North America; introduced in China
- Erigeron strigosus var. septentrionalis (Fernald & Wiegand) Fernald - much of North America; introduced in Europe

== Distribution and habitat ==
Erigeron strigosus var. calcicola is found in the central basin of Tennessee, northwest Georgia, northern Alabama, and southwest/central Kentucky. It grows in limestone glades.

Erigeron strigosus var. dolomiticola is endemic to Bibb County, Alabama, and grows in calcareous glades.

E. strigosus var. strigosus is distributed widely in North America and is found in disturbed areas, such as along roadsides, and open woodlands.

E. strigosus var. septentrionalis is also found throughout much of North America and grows on roadsides and in other disturbed areas.

== Pollen ==
Erigeron strigosus reproduces asexually and sexually in the southeastern United States. Pollen of Erigeron strigosus has been studied, larger higher quality pollen grains are typically sexual and smaller lower quality pollen grains are apomictic. Large pollen grains of Erigeron strigosus have more variable size which implies more sexual than asexual reproduction.

== Invasive ==
This species is native to eastern and central North America but has become invasive in parts of Asia and Europe. Erigeron strigosus was falsely identified as E. annuus in China because as foreign species they were not well known. It was also observed as a common invasive in Poland and forms hybrids with Erigeron annuus, two cytotypes of Erigeron strigosus were reported, a triploid (3n=27 and 4n=36) and hexaploid form. It is able to easily adapt to new regions and cross with closely related species. The family and genus Erigeron was found to have high taxonomic diversity within Russia and Europe, novel hybrids, contributes to the invasiveness of the species.

== Fire ecology ==
In part of its range Erigeron strigosus is found in tall grass prairie where fire is a regular part of the ecosystem. The cycle of fire initially causes a reduction of Erigeron strigosus, but it increases two to three years after fire. It often germinates in response to fire disturbance, and its germination rates are higher with fire disturbance than without. The cycle of fire also reduces the incidence of infections on Erigeron strigosus such as rust fungus Puccinia dioicae. Overall, increasing fire frequency has a positive effect on E. strigosus.

== Ecology ==
Erigeron strigosus is insect pollinated and is recorded to have been visited in northern Florida by Agapostemon splendens, Augochloropsis metallica, and Ceratina, Halictus poeyi/ligatus, Heriades variolosa/leavitti, Lasioglossum longifrons, Lasioglossum pectorale, Lasioglossum reticulatum, Lasioglossum vierecki, and Megachile petulans.
