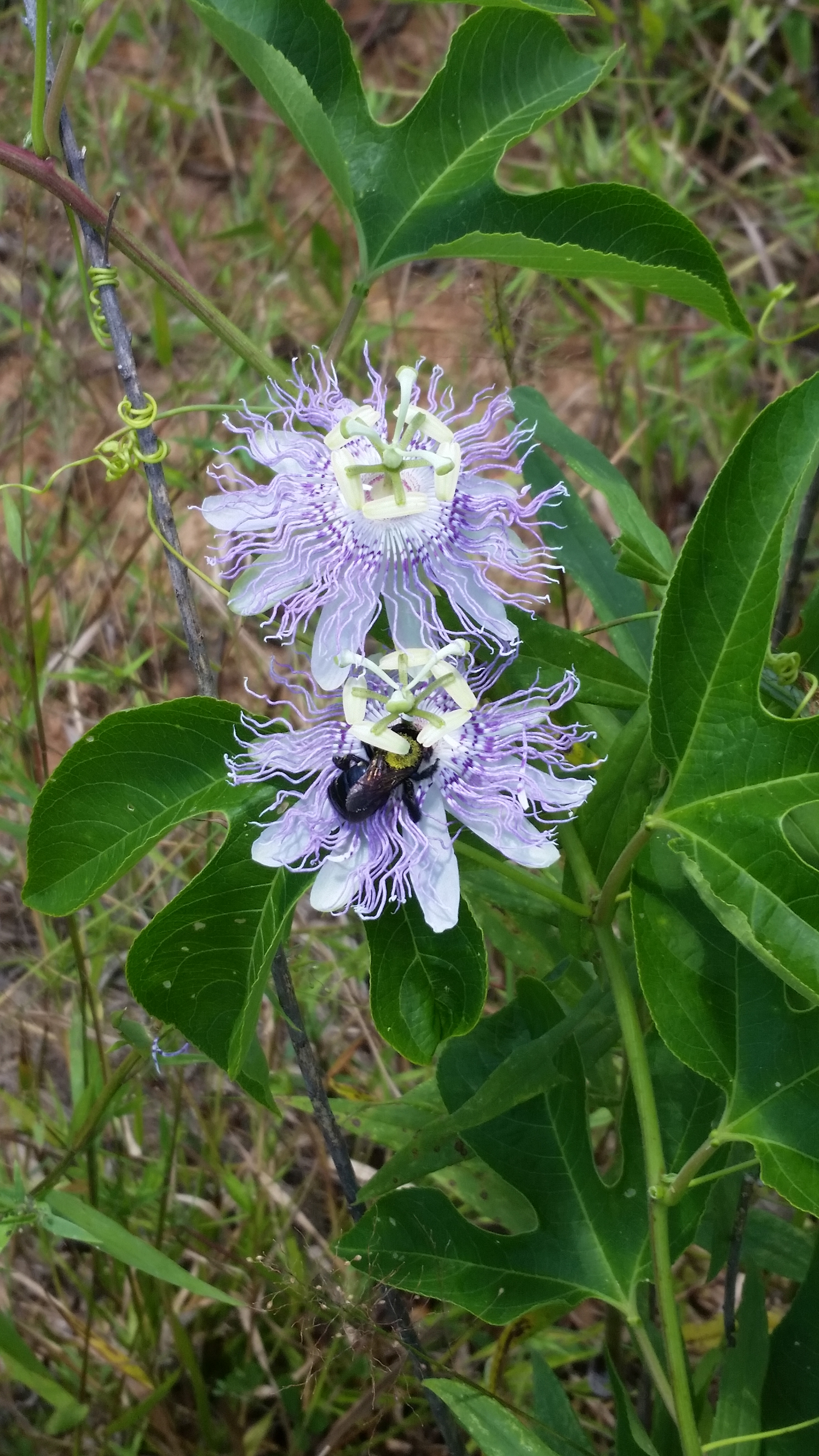
- Flower
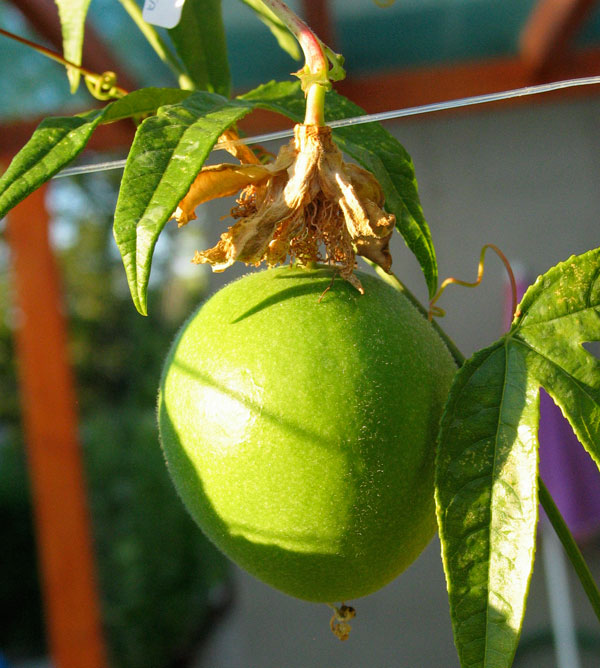
- Fruit

Conservation status
- Secure (NatureServe)

Scientific classification
- Kingdom: Plantae
- Clade: Tracheophytes
- Clade: Angiosperms
- Clade: Eudicots
- Clade: Rosids
- Order: Malpighiales
- Family: Passifloraceae
- Genus: Passiflora
- Species: P. incarnata

Binomial name
- Passiflora incarnata L., 1753
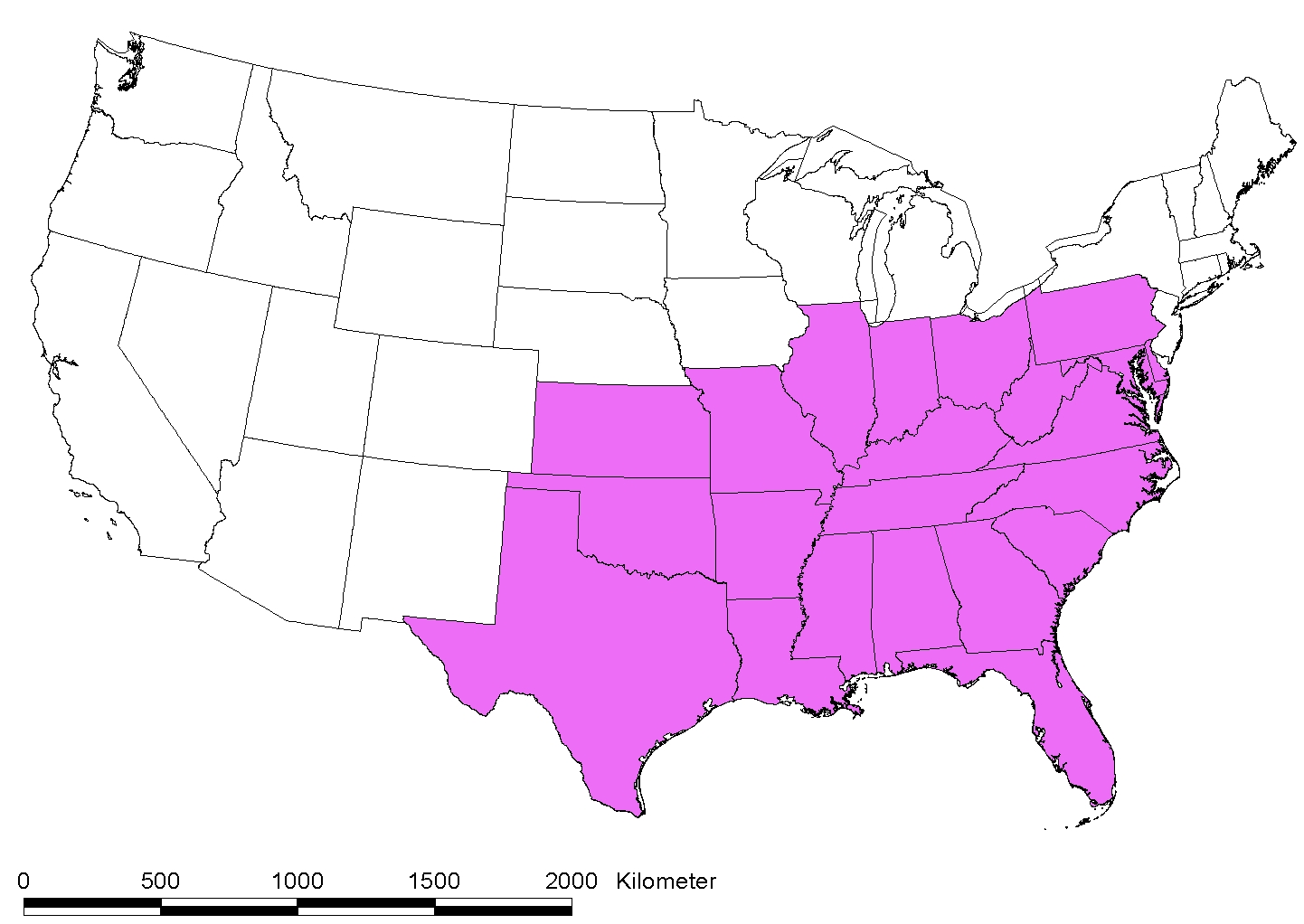

= Passiflora incarnata =

Species of vine

Passiflora incarnata, commonly known as maypop, purple passionflower, true passionflower, wild apricot, and wild passion vine, is a fast-growing perennial vine with climbing or trailing stems. A member of the passionflower genus Passiflora, the maypop has large, intricate flowers with prominent styles and stamens. One of the hardiest species of passionflower, it is both found as a wildflower in the southern United States and in cultivation for its edible fruit and striking bluish purple blooms.

== Description ==
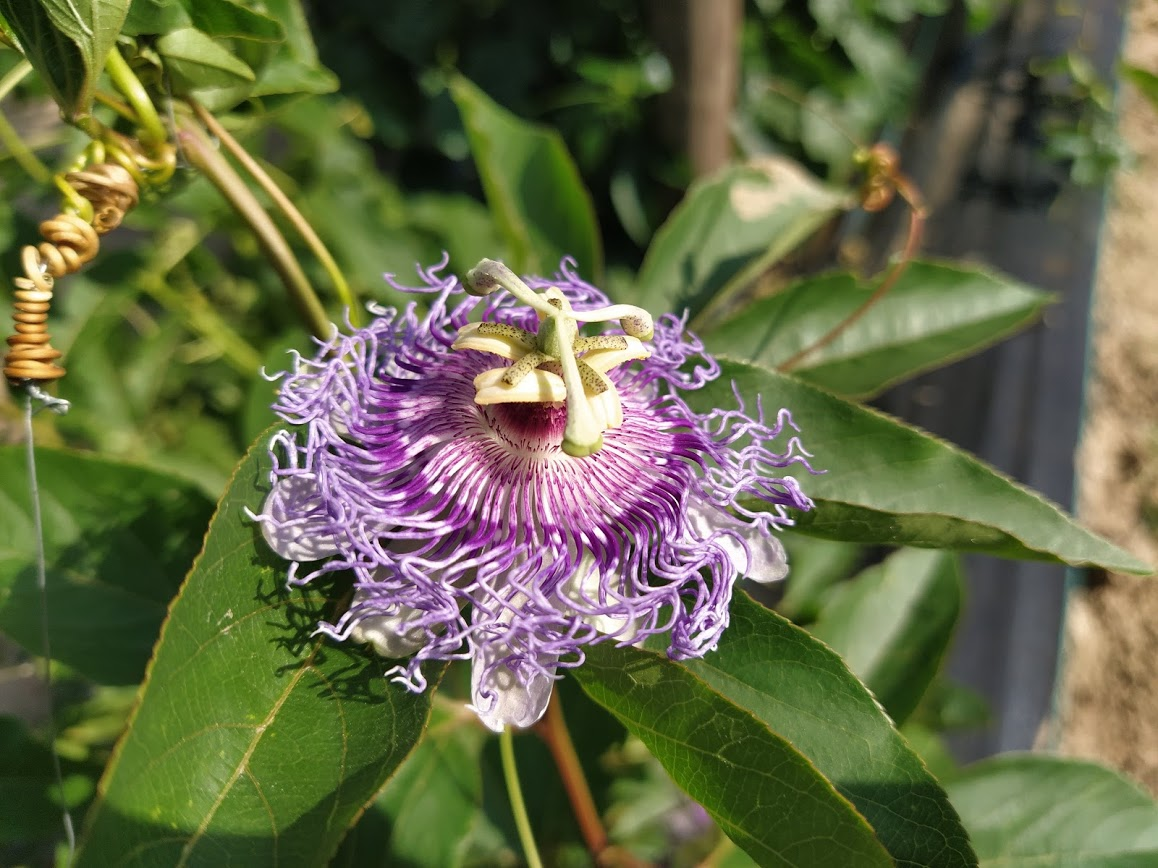
Passiflora incarnata

The stems can be smooth or pubescent; they are long and trailing, possessing many tendrils. Leaves are alternate and palmately three lobed and occasionally five lobed, measuring 6–15 centimetres (2.4–5.9 in). They have two characteristic glands at the base of the blade on the petiole that secrete drops of sweet nectar. Flowers have five bluish-white petals. They exhibit a white and purple corona, a structure of fine appendages between the petals and stamens. The large flower is typically arranged in a ring above the petals and sepals. They are pollinated by insects such as bumblebees and carpenter bees, and are self-sterile. The flower normally begins to bloom in July.

The fleshy fruit, also referred to as a maypop, is an oval yellowish berry about the size of a hen egg; it is green, though it may become yellow-green to yellow-orange as it matures. Like other passifloras, the pulp is gelatinous and encases the seeds. The color of the pulp is originally white and becomes a dull yellow when ripe. The seeds are black and approximately 5 mm in size. As with other passifloras, it is the larval food of a number of lepidoptera species, including the zebra longwing, the Gulf fritillary, the crimson-patched longwing, the Julia, the Plebeian sphinx, and the variegated fritillary. In many cases its fruit is very popular with wildlife. The egg-shaped green fruits may pop when stepped on. This phenomenon gives the P. incarnata its common name, as well as the fact that its roots can remain dormant for most of the winter underground and then the rest of the plant "pops" out of the ground by May, unharmed by the snow.

The maypop occurs in thickets, disturbed areas, near riverbanks, and near unmowed pastures, roadsides, and railroads. It thrives in areas with plentiful sunlight. It is not found in shady areas beneath a forest canopy.

The Cherokee in the Tennessee area called it ocoee; the Ocoee River and valley are named after this plant, which is the Tennessee state wildflower. The local salamander Desmognathus ocoee in the Tennessee region is also named after the Cherokee word for P. incarnata. For thousands of years the maypop was a staple food and medicinal plant for the Cherokee and to this day it is a revered piece of their heritage. This, and other passionflowers are the exclusive larval host plants for the Gulf fritillary and non-exclusive for the variegated fritillary butterflies.

== Cultivation ==
Passiflora incarnata is easily cultivated and in its native range and homeland is a common low maintenance garden plant that can be trained to adorn fences and arbors. Passiflora incarnata fruit contain many seeds, each surrounded by an aril holding edible juice, and this juice can be consumed fresh or used to flavor processed products. The wild maypop is an aggressive vine native to the southeastern United States extending into the central US reaching Illinois, Indiana, and Ohio. The vines can carpet the floor of thickets within days in favorable weather. The plants grow in full sun and need direct sunlight for at least half of the day. The best soils for P. incarnata are well-drained but the plants tolerate occasionally wet and acidic soils. The plants have a high drought tolerance. P. incarnata can be planted all the year in zone 6–11 (hardiness zone). The space between two plants is 36–60 inches (91.44 – 152.4 cm). One to two years are necessary before they begin bearing. Each flower has a very short life (about one day). Then the fruit develops in two to three months. The harvest depends on vine size and age of the plant but one reported 10–20 fruits per vine. Seeds can be collected in the fall after the fruit has begun to shrivel. There are some problems with nematodes and caterpillars in the culture of P. incarnata.

The flowers appear suitable for carpenter bee pollination and may attract hummingbirds. As both bees and hummingbirds look for nectar, the pollen filled flower anthers brush the back of the bee or the face of the hummingbird, enabling pollen to be readily transferred to the central sticky stigma.

Passiflora incarnata can potentially become an agricultural weed. The genus Passiflora introduced for agricultural purpose has been reported as an important weed in certain regions of the world. The United States Department of Agriculture notes that P. incarnata is referred to as a weed by these publications: Weeds of Kentucky and adjacent states: a field guide and Weeds of the United States and Canada.

Mechanical control such as by removing the suckers regularly is advised to prevent the spreading of maypop. It is also recommended to train the vines onto trellis and fences to limit propagation.

=== Propagation ===
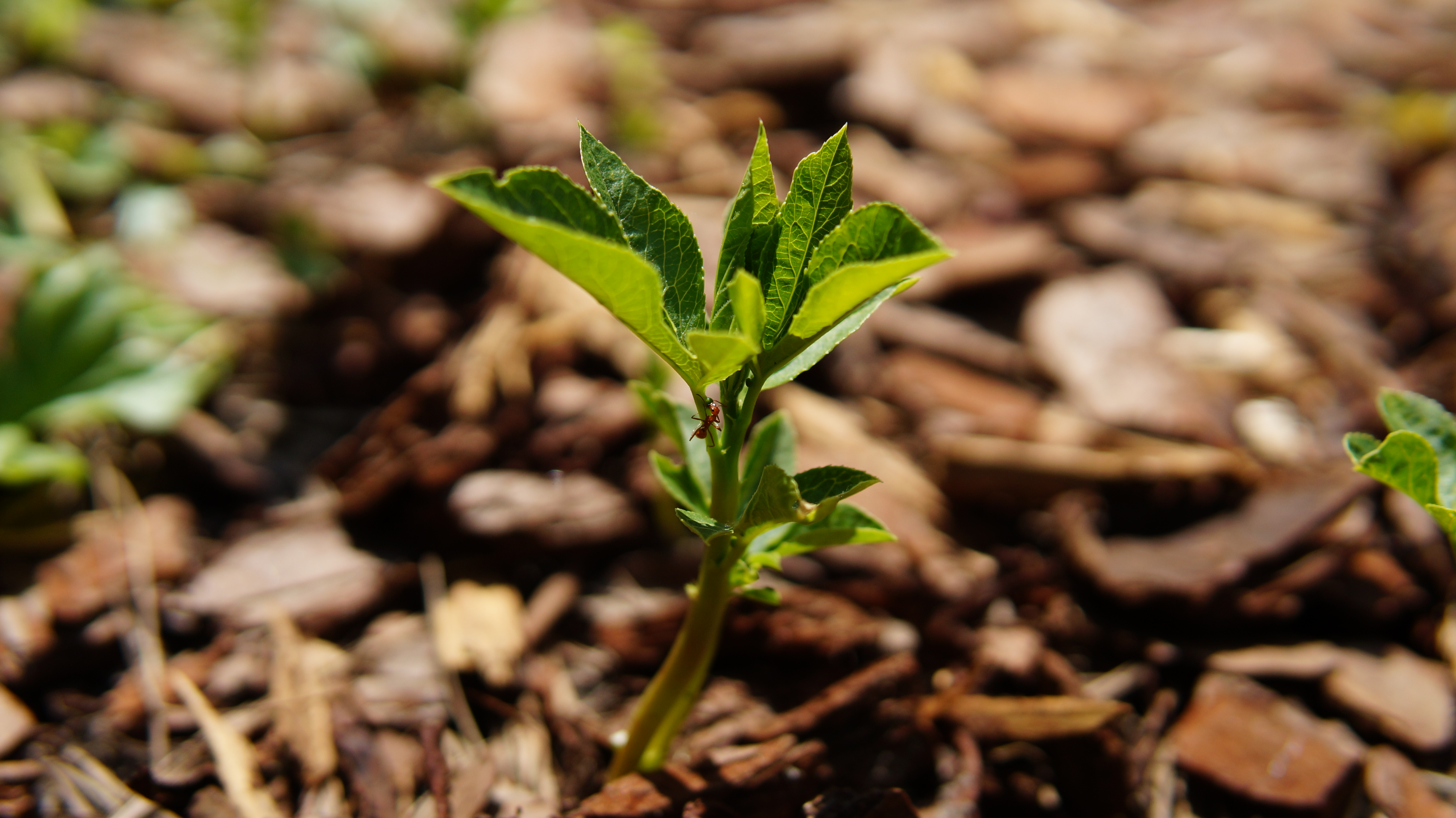
Sprouting maypop in July

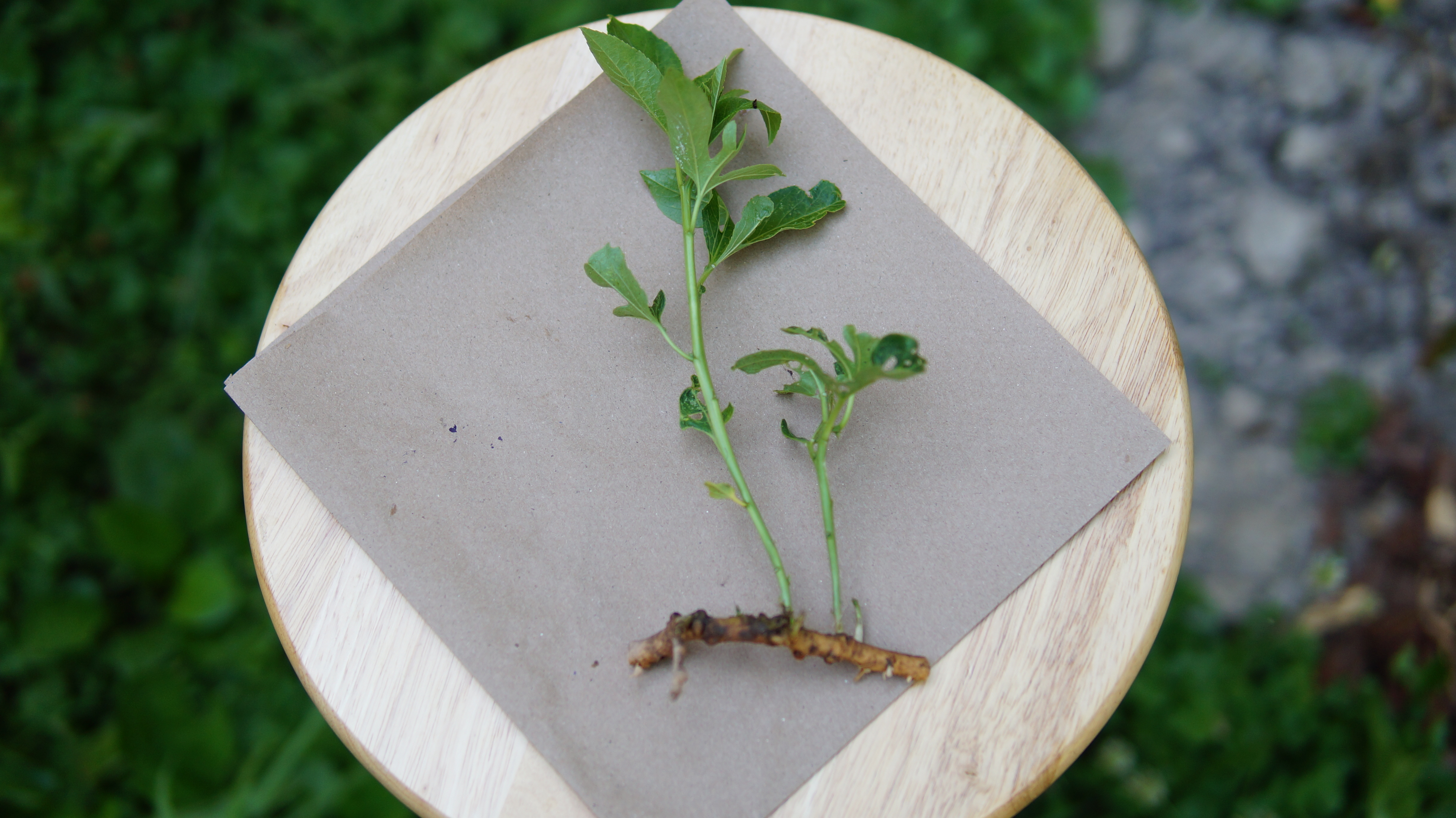
A cutting harvested after sprouting inground

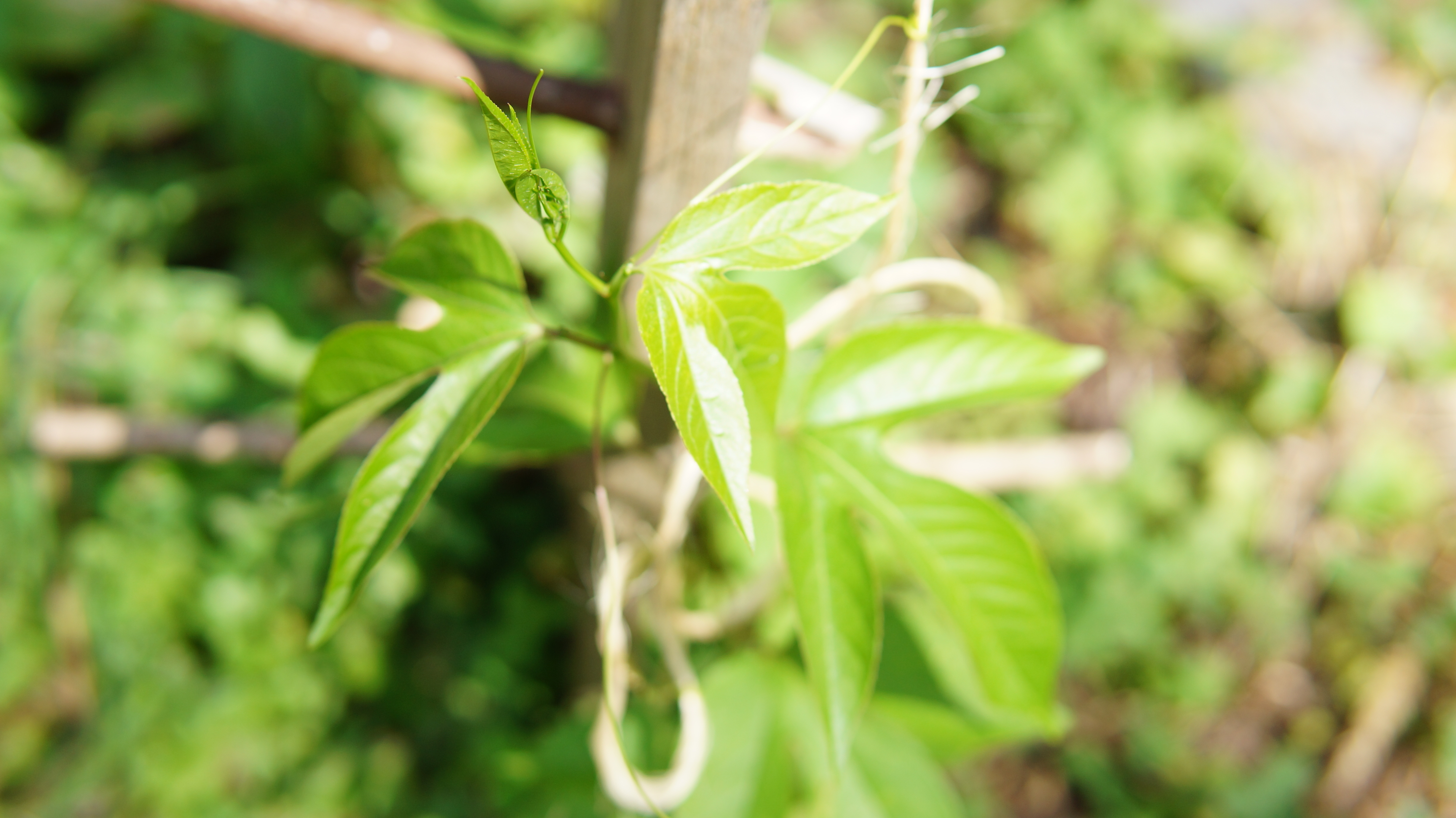
Three year old maypop grown from seed

P. incarnata seeds exhibit negative photoblasty, and they are sensitive to soil temperature. When sown in darkness in very warm soil (35°C to 40°C), seeds germinate in 5 to 10 days at rates near 90%. Prechilling, leaching, and gibberellic acid improve germination at suboptimal germination temperatures. Without pretreatment, germination is often slow and incomplete at temperatures below 35°C.

Propagation by root is also reliable. A healthy 4- to 8-inch cutting guarantees strong sprouting within a month, regardless of the harvest time of the year. Thicker roots are more vigorous and can usually be found by digging no deeper than 2 inches in the soil.

The actual lifespan of the maypop plant is not documented. Therefore, how long the root-propagated plants would last, by age of the parent plant, is currently unknown. Maypops planted from seed seem healthier.

The roots themselves grow thick and long across the ground, mostly of a uniform diameter, and do not branch often. The smaller, more branching thin roots eventually grow into longer roots, which become thicker with age.

=== Pests ===
Once they find it and congregate, Japanese beetles eat massive amounts of the leaves and some of the flowers.

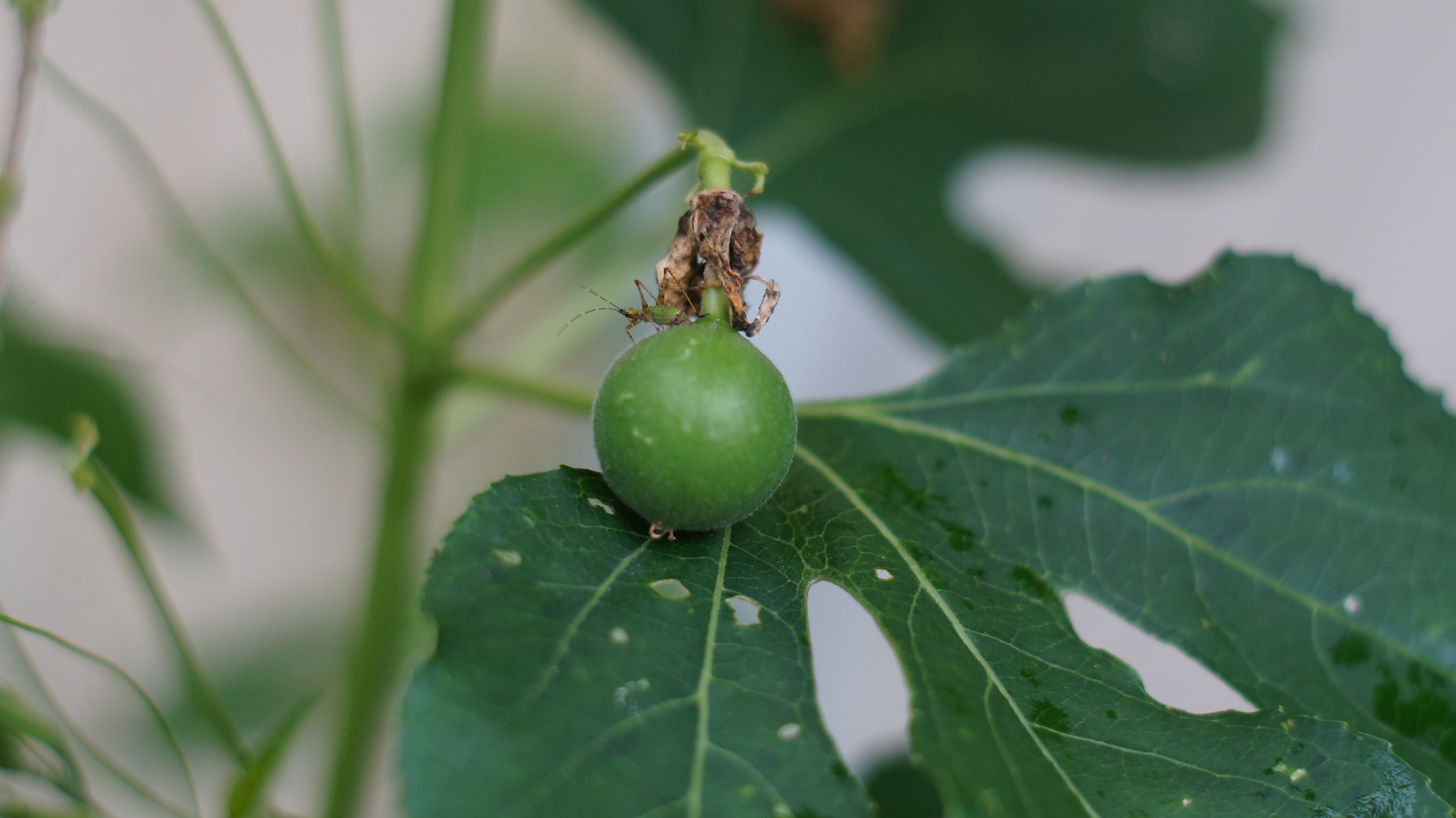
Immature fruit

== Traditional medicine ==
=== Historical uses and folk medicine ===
Historically, the plant has been used as a herbal medicine.

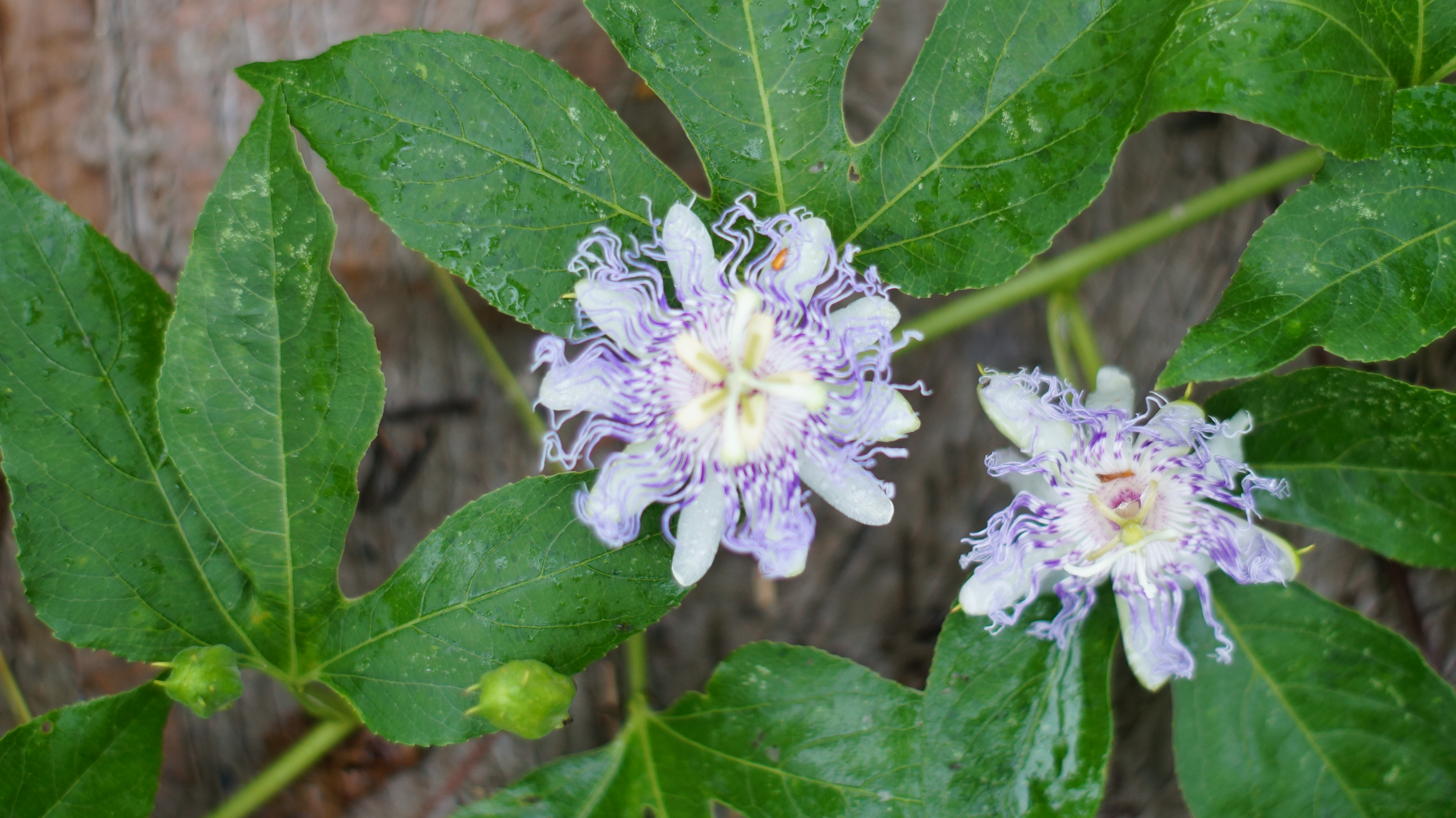
Maypop with slight pest damage

Passionflower is included in pharmacopeias, such as the European and British Pharmacopoeias in which the dried aerial parts of the plant are mentioned. In North America and South America, tea made from the roots is used as a tonic. The U.S. Food and Drug Administration withdrew approval of its marketing because manufacturers did not submit any evidence regarding its safety and effectiveness.

=== Safety ===
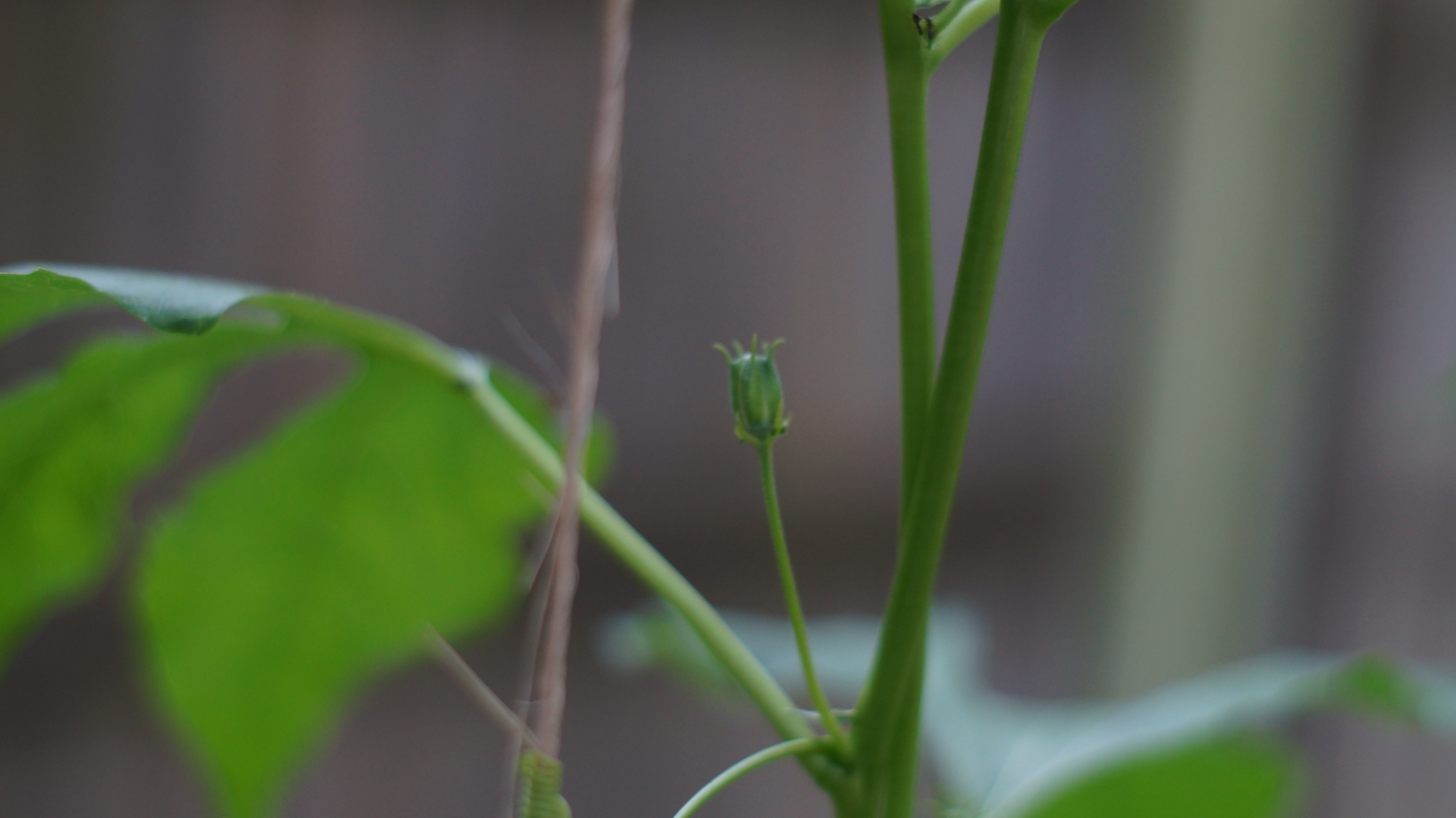
Young unbloomed flower

A 2013 literature review found that the herb has "a good safety profile". One study found that a daily intake of 800 mg of a dried alcoholic extract, taken over the course of 8 weeks for anxiety, appeared to have been safe.

Passionflower is used as a natural flavoring agent in food manufacturing and is generally recognized as a safe substance (GRAS).

P. incarnata is also listed in the European Register of Feed additives as an animal feed additive.

=== Interactions ===
Possible interactions with following medications:

- Sedatives
- Anticoagulants
- Monoamine oxidase inhibitors

P. incarnata may increase main effects or side effects of medications listed above.

For oral consumption, pregnant or breastfeeding women should use caution and seek medical advice before orally consuming P. incarnata. The effects of oral ingestion of the plant compounds on reproduction or on unborn child have not been tested.

== Phytochemistry ==
P. incarnata contains flavonoids with antioxidant potential and alkaloids, with leaves containing the greatest concentration of flavonoids. Other flavonoids present in P. incarnata include chrysin, apigenin, luteolin, quercetin, kaempferol, and isovitexin.

== Culinary uses ==
Passionflower has culinary fruits that may be used for jams, jellies and desserts. The juice is a favorite flavoring in drinks. It can be used as a fresh substitute for its commercially grown South American relative, Passiflora edulis, a related species with similar sized fruit. The fruit can be eaten by hand; it has a mildly sweet-tart taste similar to an apricot and a pleasant scent when fully ripe. The Passiflora family have aromatic, sweet fruit that make it highly appreciated for fresh consumption and as a flavoring aid.

== Ecology ==
Passiflora incarnata is insect pollinated and is recorded to have been visited in northern Florida by Ceratina, Lasioglossum reticulatum, Lasioglossum weemsi/leviense, and Melissodes communis.
