= Silky swallow-wort =

Silky swallow-wort is a common name for several plants and may refer to:

- Asclepias syriaca
- Asclepias tuberosa, native to eastern and southwestern North America
