= Orange-root =

Orange-root is a common name for several plants and may refer to:

- Asclepias tuberosa, butterfly milkweed
- Hydrastis canadensis, goldenseal

== See also ==
- Sanguinaria, Bloodroot
