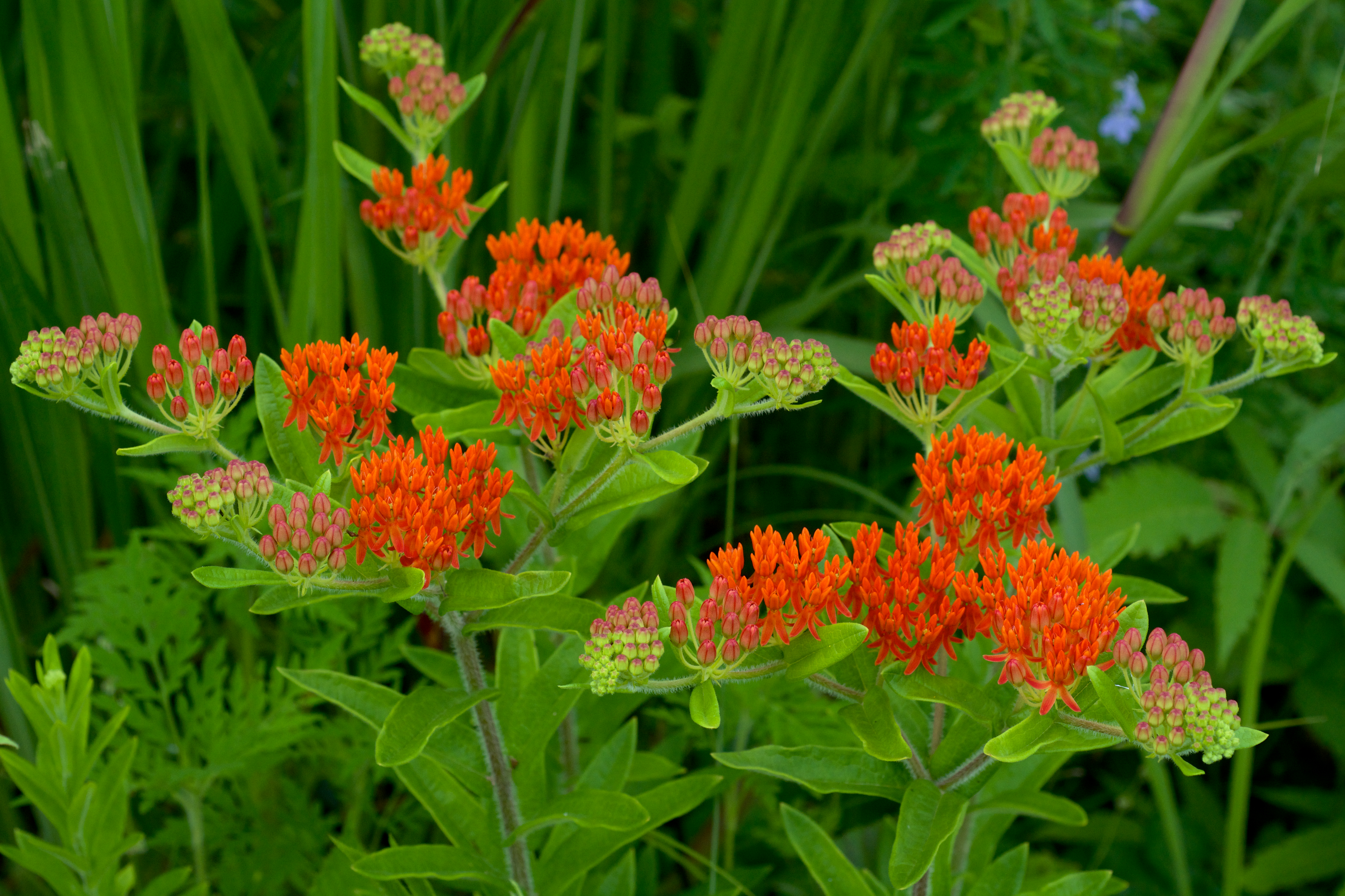

Conservation status
- Secure (NatureServe)

Scientific classification
- Kingdom: Plantae
- Clade: Embryophytes
- Clade: Tracheophytes
- Clade: Spermatophytes
- Clade: Angiosperms
- Clade: Eudicots
- Clade: Asterids
- Order: Gentianales
- Family: Apocynaceae
- Genus: Asclepias
- Species: A. tuberosa

Binomial name
- Asclepias tuberosa L.

Synonyms
- Acerates decumbens Decne.; Asclepias decumbens L.; Asclepias elliptica Raf.; Asclepias lutea Raf. nom. illeg.; Asclepias revoluta Raf.; Asclepias rolfsii Britton ex Vail

= Asclepias tuberosa =

Species of flowering plant

Asclepias tuberosa, commonly known as butterfly weed or pleurisy root, is a species of milkweed native to eastern and southwestern North America. It is commonly known as butterfly weed because of the butterflies that are attracted to the plant by its color and its copious production of nectar.

== Description ==
It is a perennial plant growing to 0.3–1 m (1–3 1/2 ft) tall. The leaves are spirally arranged, lanceolate, 3–12 cm (1 1/4–4 3/4 in) long, and 2–3 cm (3/4–1 1/4 in) broad.

From April to September, in the upper axils, 7.5 cm (3 in)–wide umbels of orange, yellow or red flowers 1.5 cm (1/2 in) wide appear. They each have five petals and five sepals. It is uncertain if reddish flowers are due to soil mineral content, ecotype genetic differentiation, or both. A cultivar named "hello yellow" typically has more yellowish flowers than ordinary examples of this plant.

The fruit pod is 7.5–15 cm (3–6 in) long, containing many long-haired seeds.

=== Similar species ===
The plant looks similar to the lanceolate milkweed (Asclepias lanceolata), but is uniquely identified by the larger number of flowers, and the hairy stems that are not milky when broken. It is most commonly found in fields with dry soil. Tropical milkweed (Asclepias curassavica) can resemble Asclepias tuberosa in its red form but also lacks hairy stems.

== Taxonomy ==
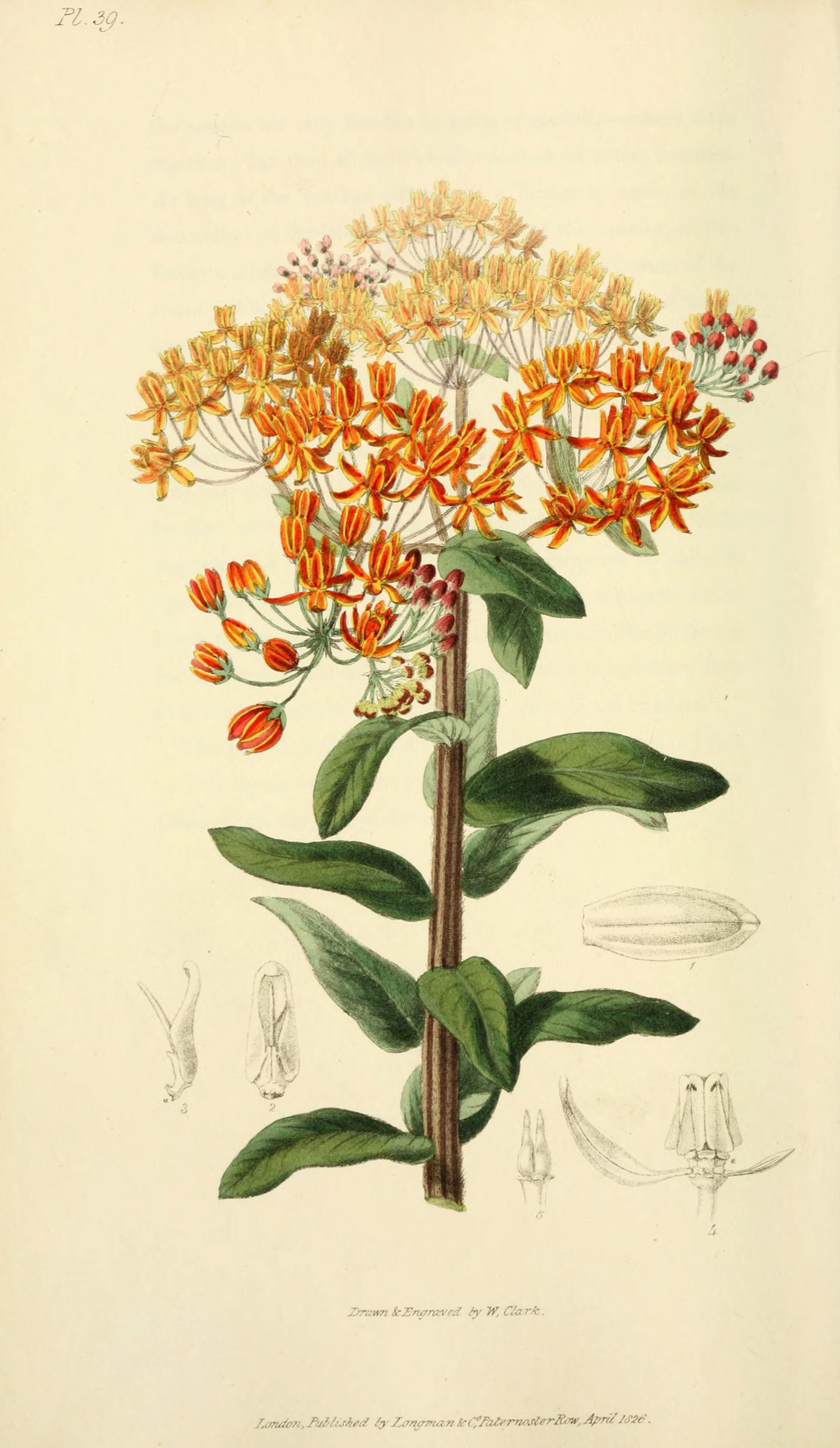
Illustration showing details of plant.

=== Subspecies ===
- Asclepias tuberosa subsp. interior – (Central United States, Ontario and Quebec)
- Asclepias tuberosa subsp. rolfsii – Rolfs milkweed (Southeastern United States)
- Asclepias tuberosa subsp. tuberosa – (Eastern United States)

=== Common names ===
Common names include butterfly weed, Canada root, chieger flower, chiggerflower, fluxroot, Indian paintbrush, Indian posy, orange milkweed, orange root, orange swallow-wort, pleurisy root, silky swallow-wort, tuber root, yellow milkweed, white-root, windroot, butterfly love, butterflyweed, and butterfly milkweed.

== Distribution and habitat ==
The species can be found from South Dakota south to Texas and Mexico, west to Utah and Arizona, as well as many other areas further east.

This plant favors dry, sand or gravel soil, but has also been reported on stream margins. It requires full sun.

== Ecology ==
Most easily propagated by seed. The primary pollinators are bees and wasps, rather than butterflies. Sown outdoors after frost, a plant will flower and produce seed in the third year. It is difficult to transplant once established, as it has a deep, woody taproot.

A. tuberosa is a larval food plant of the queen and monarch butterflies, as well as the dogbane tiger moth, milkweed tussock moth, and the unexpected cycnia. Because of its rough leaves and trichomes, it is not a preferred host plant of the monarch butterfly but caterpillars can be reared on it successfully. Further, it is one of the very lowest Asclepias species in cardenolide content, making it a poor source of protection from bird predation and parasite virulence and perhaps contributing to its lack of attractiveness to egg-laying monarchs.

A. tuberosa has been found to be largely unaffected by repeated prescribed burns.

Asclepias tuberosa is insect pollinated and is recorded to have been visited in northern Florida by the bee species Augochloropsis anonyma, Augochloropsis metallica, Augochloropsis sumptuosa, Lasioglossum pectorale, Lasioglossum reticulatum, Lasioglossum vierecki, Megachile petulans, Megachile texana, and Melissodes communis.

== Cultivation ==
Butterfly weed is frequently grown in gardens for its showy orange flowers which are especially attractive to bees, though also visited by hummingbirds, moths, and butterflies. It is easily grown from seeds and is difficult to transplant due to the size of its roots. Grown from seed plants will take about two to three years to reach flowering size in average conditions. The seeds do not require stratification and can be immediately planted, though in commercial growing they are generally moist stratified at 5 °C for 30–60 days because this increases the germination rate. For other milkweeds a thin layer of mulch a layer 1–2 cm thick increases the germination rate, though specific research on butterfly weed is lacking.

Butterfly weed has few serious pest or disease problems. It is susceptible to crown rot if planted in poorly drained or too constantly moist locations. It is hardy in USDA zones 3–9.

== Toxicity ==
The plant contains toxic progesterone-like steroids that can cause weakness, seizures and corneal injuries. Use of the plant as an herbal remedy is contraindicated in pregnancy, during lactation or for infants and children.

== Uses ==
Native Americans and European pioneers used the boiled roots to treat diarrhea and respiratory illnesses. The young seed pods were used as food after being boiled in several changes of water. The seed pod down was spun and used to make candle wicks.

The ethanol extract of the root was once used to treat pleurisy.

== Gallery ==
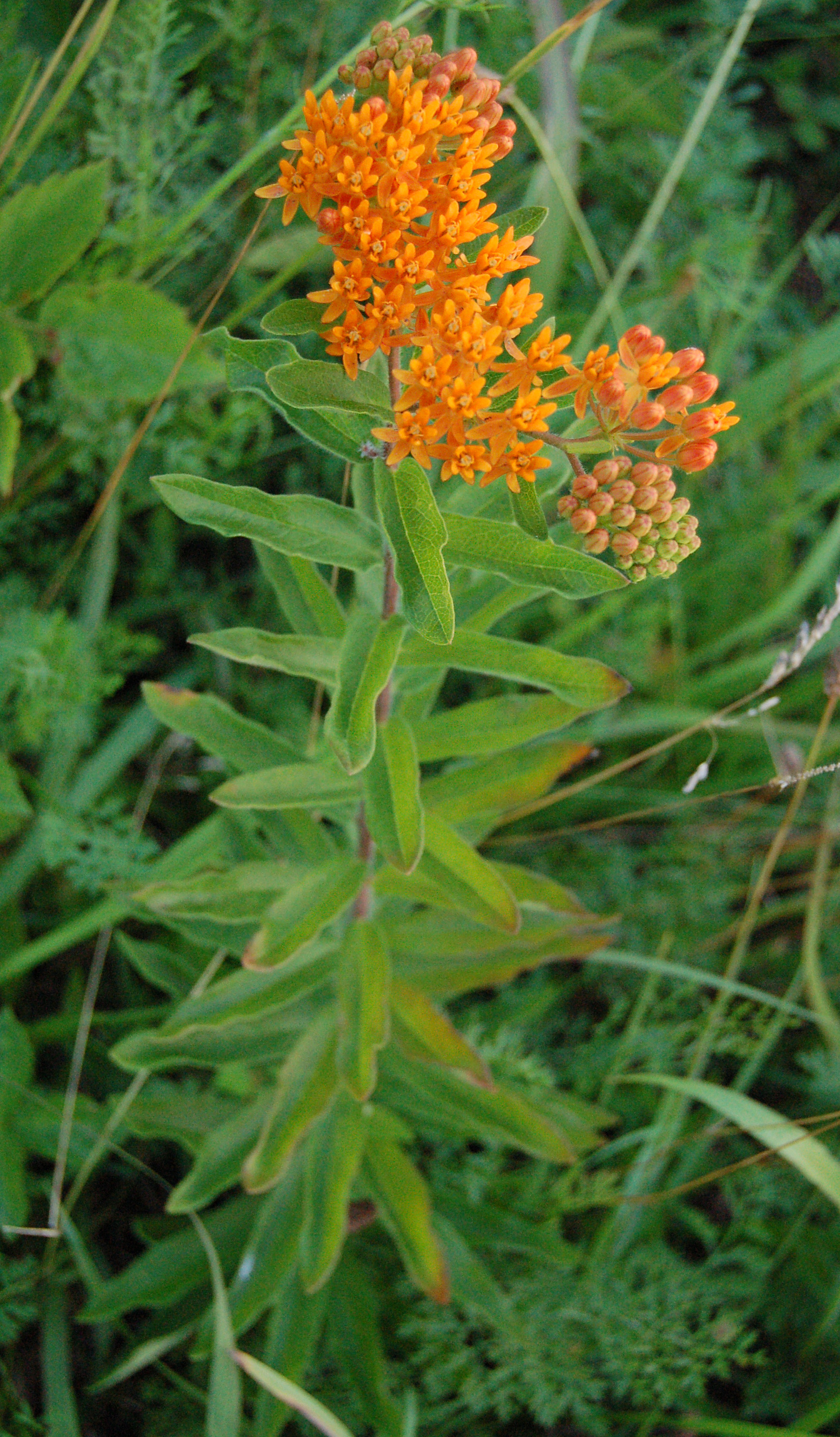
Entire plant from the ground to the flower

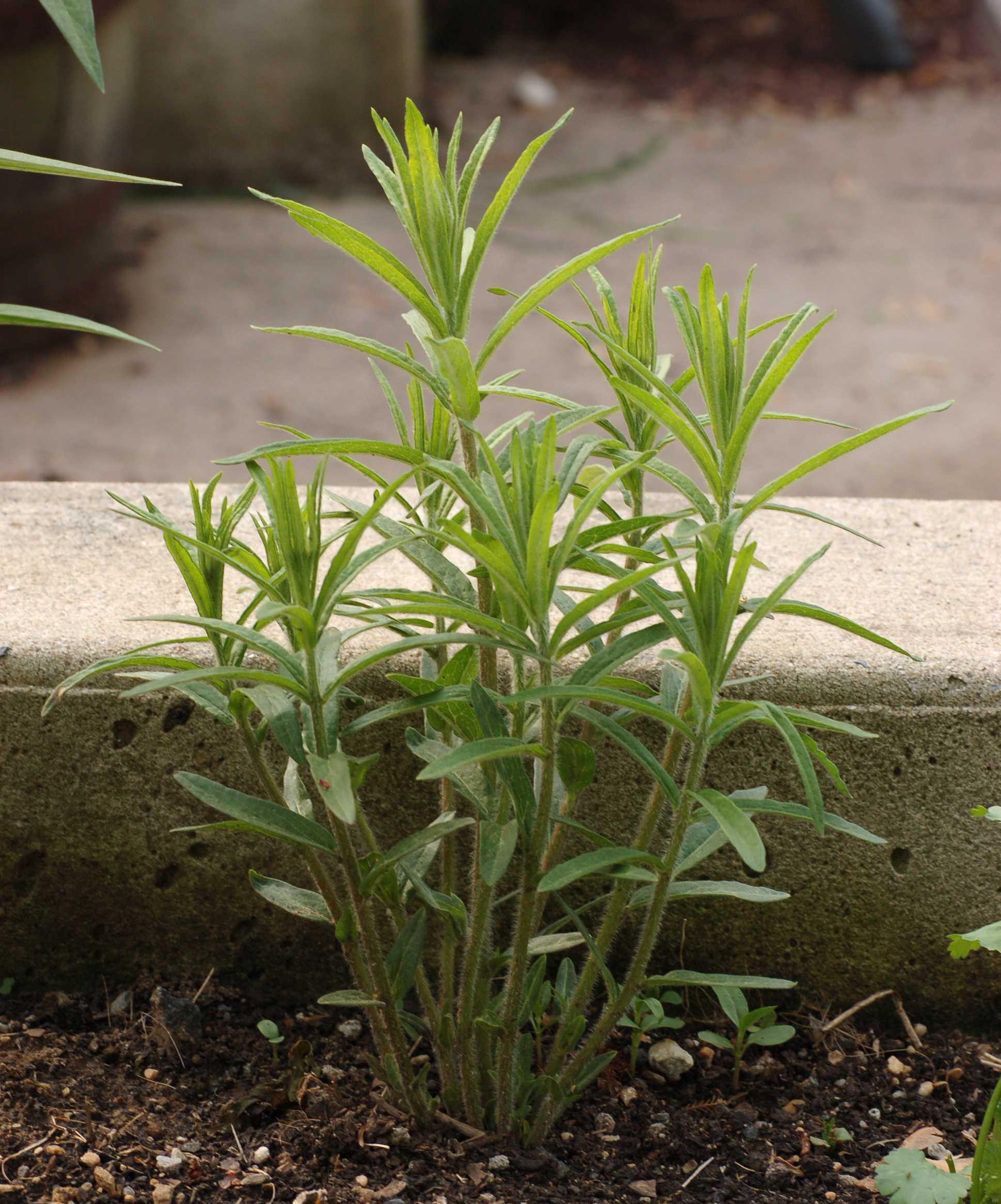
Young stems during spring

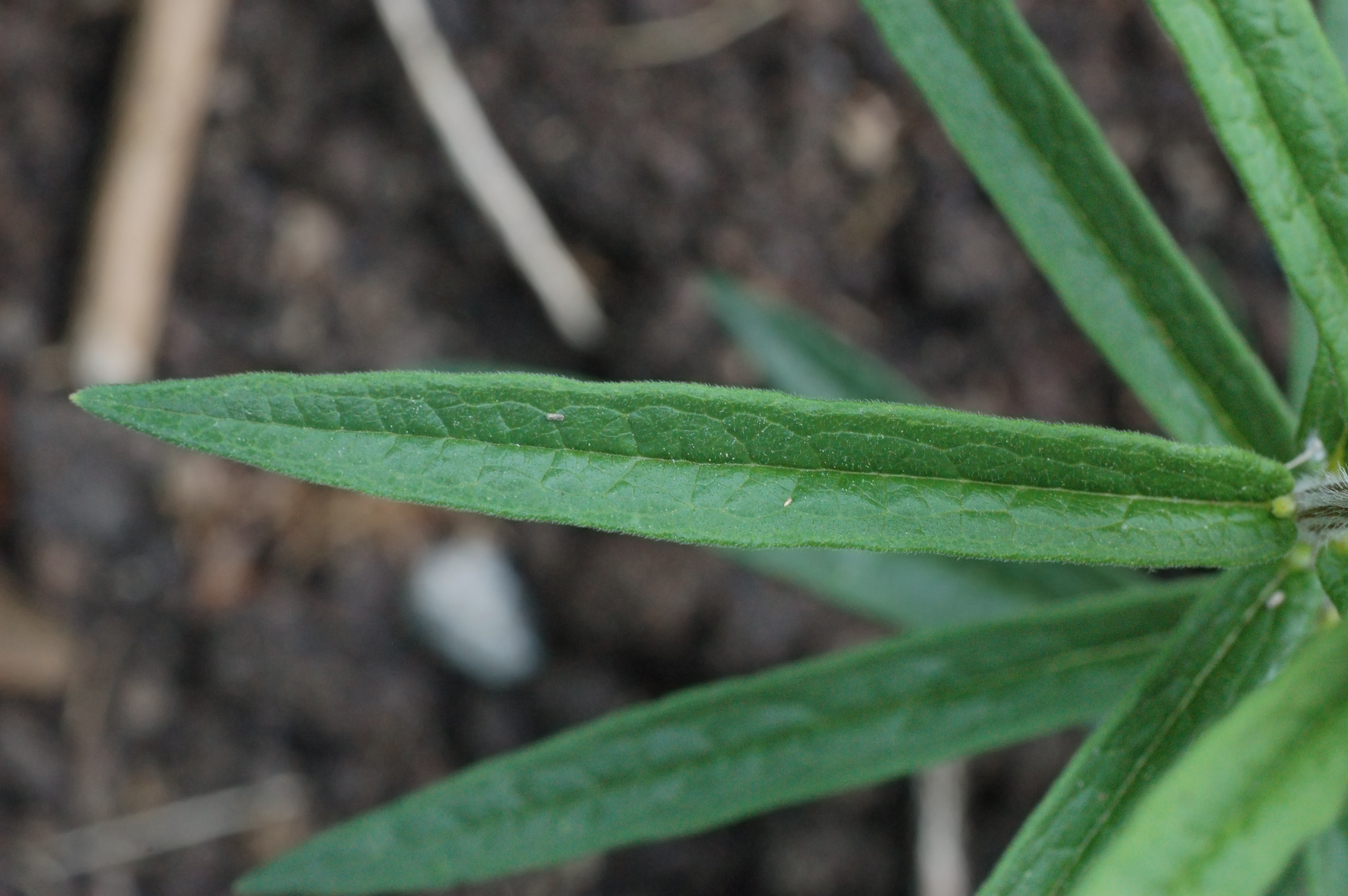
A young leaf

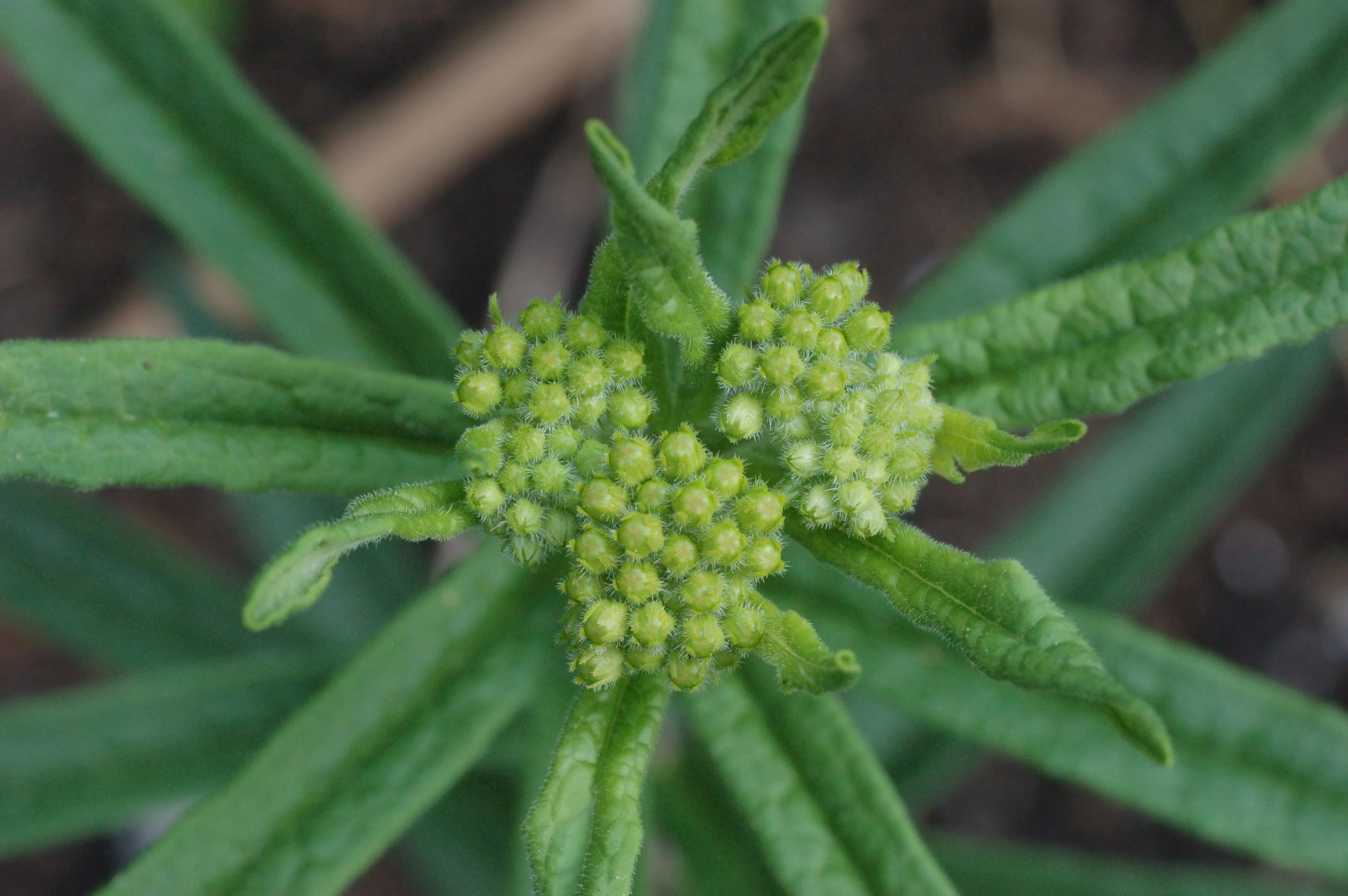
An emerging flower head

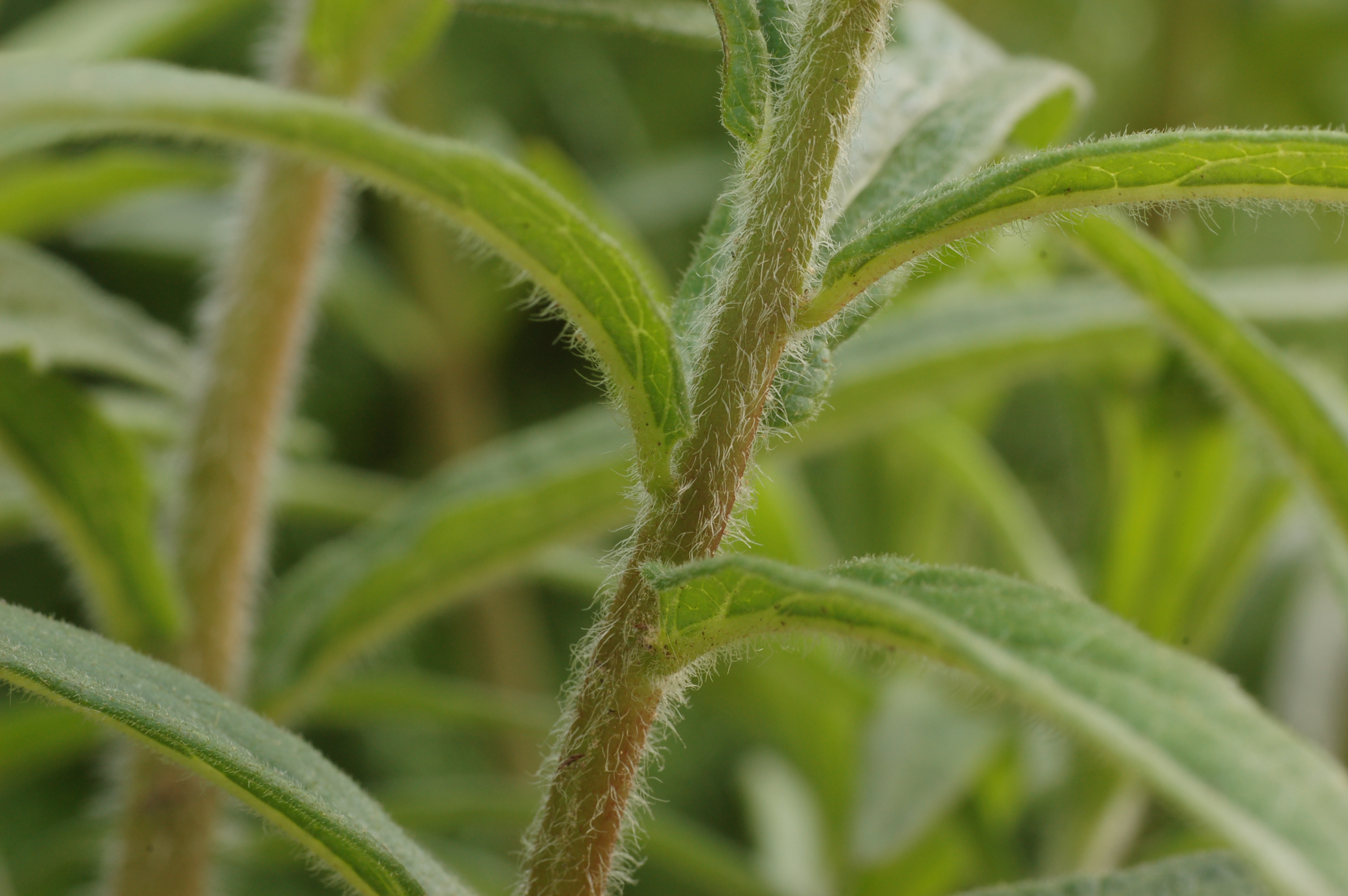
Closeup of the hairy stems

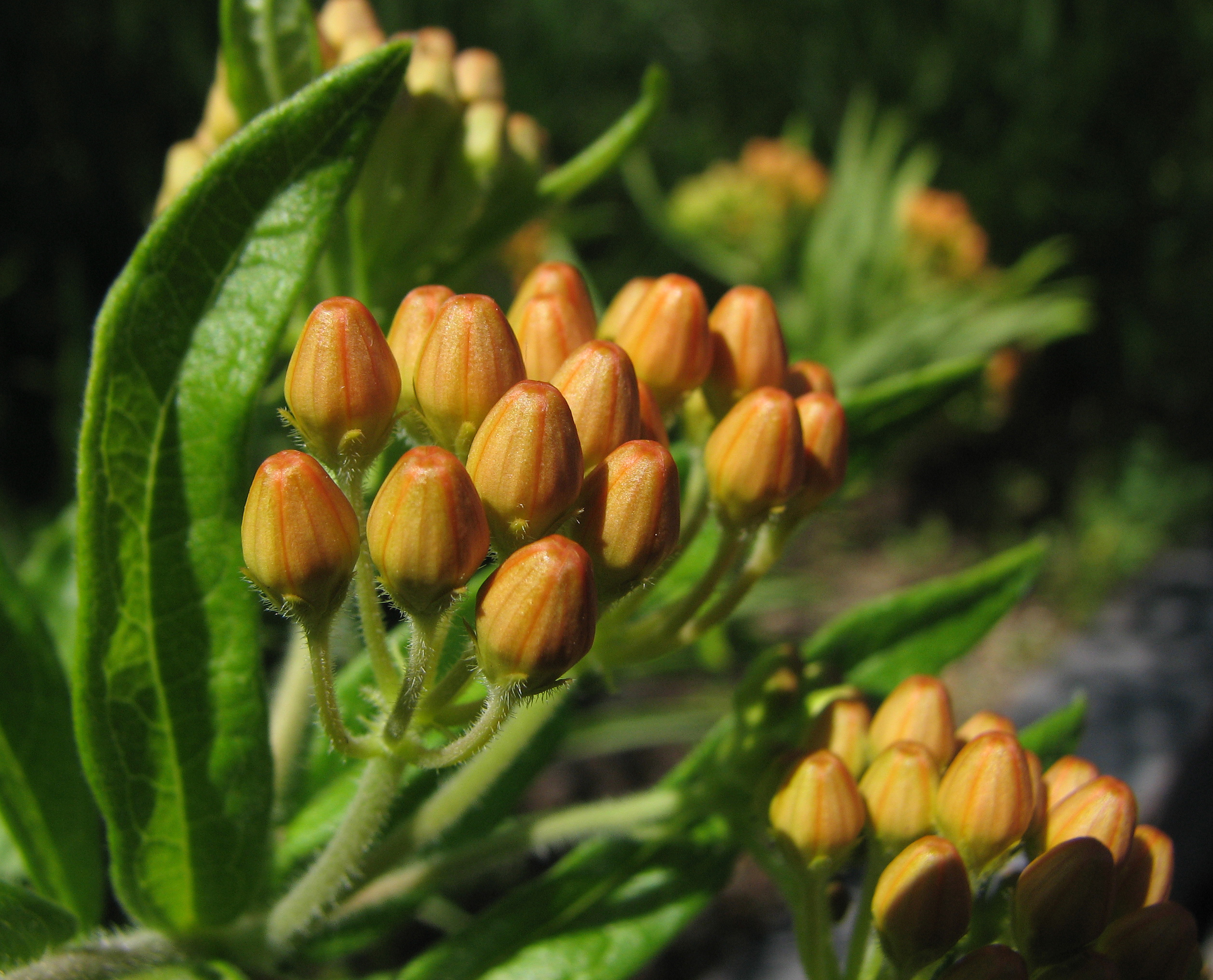
Closeup of unopened buds

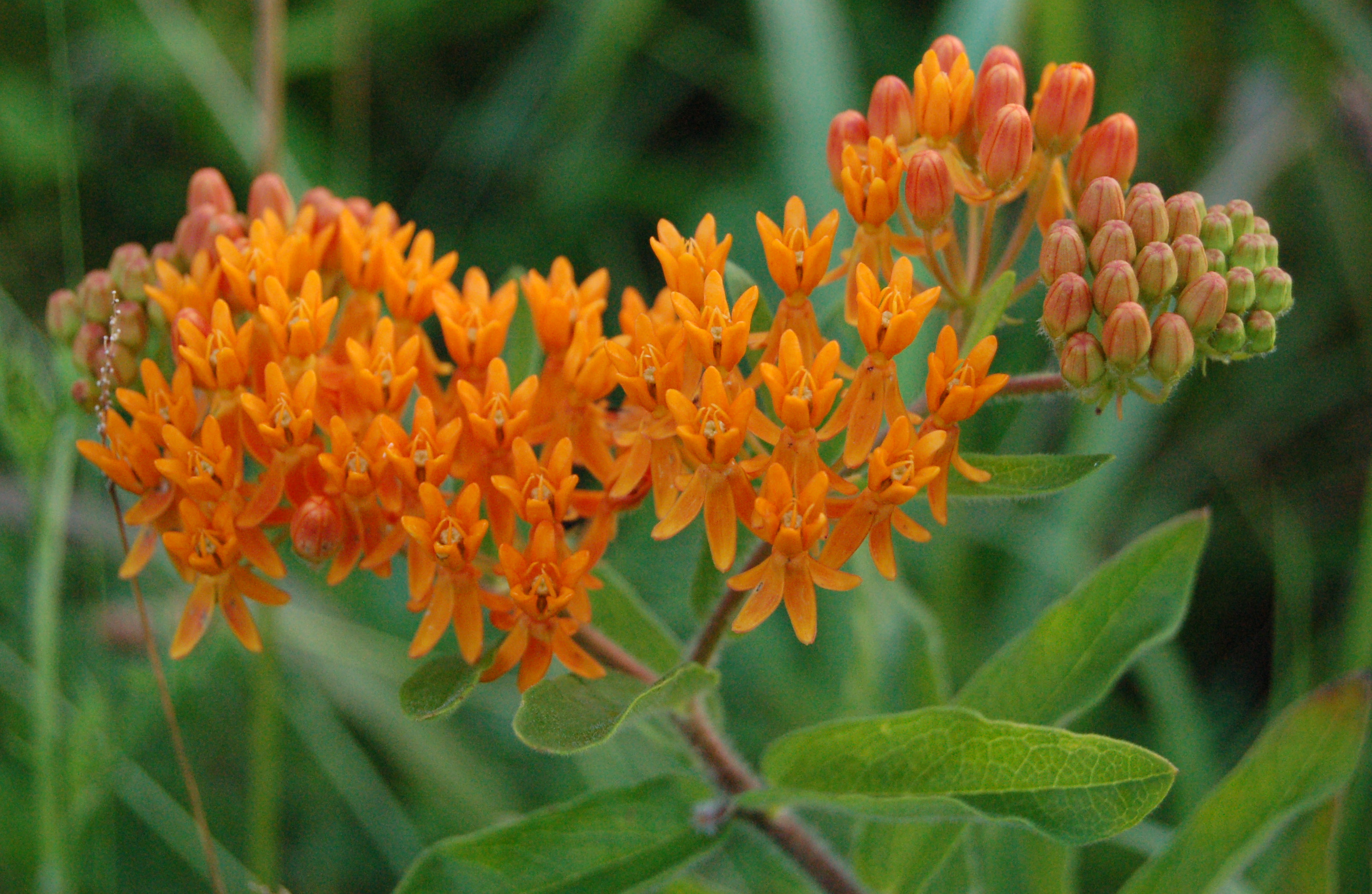
Flower head

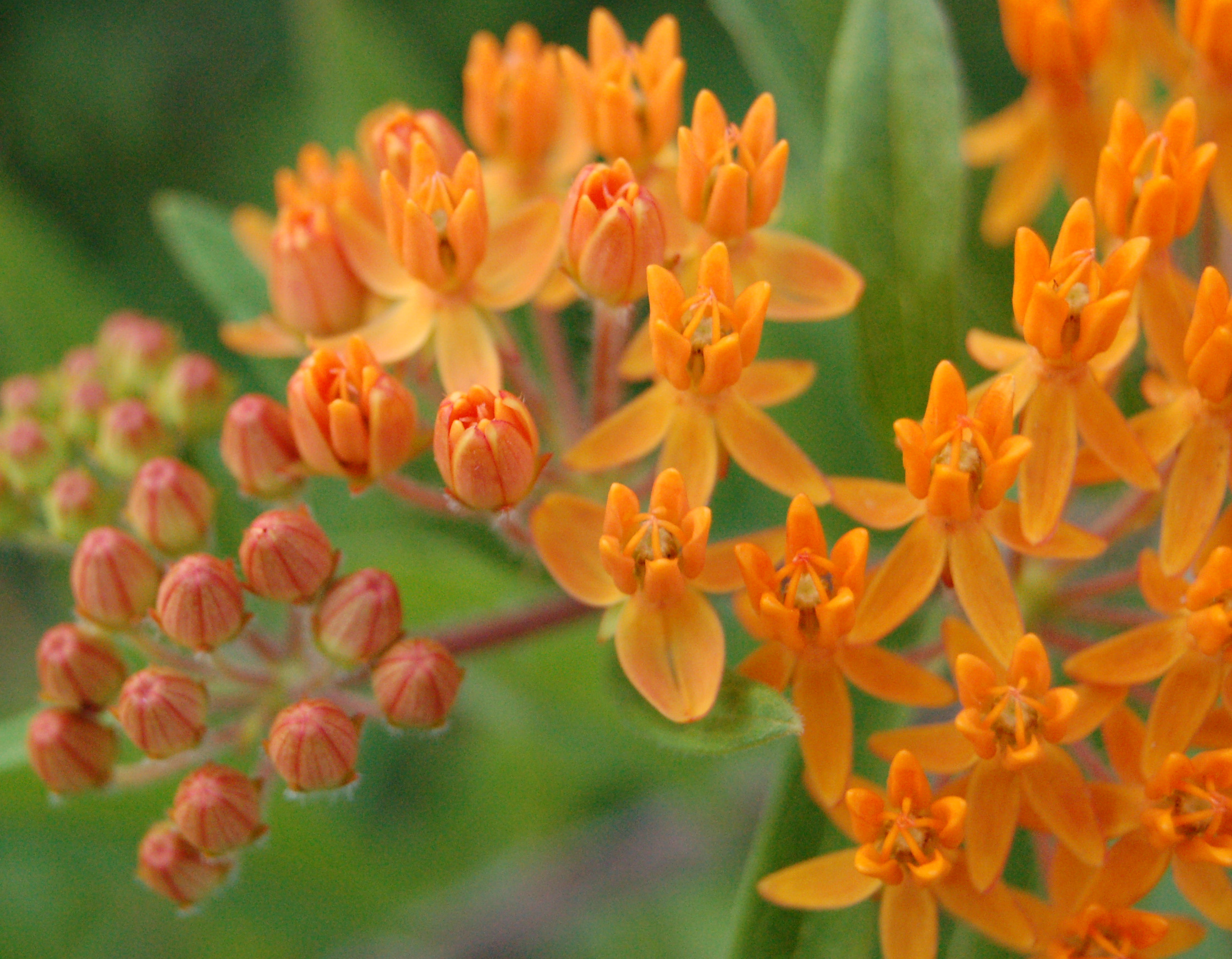
Closeup showing unopened, opening, and fully opened flower buds

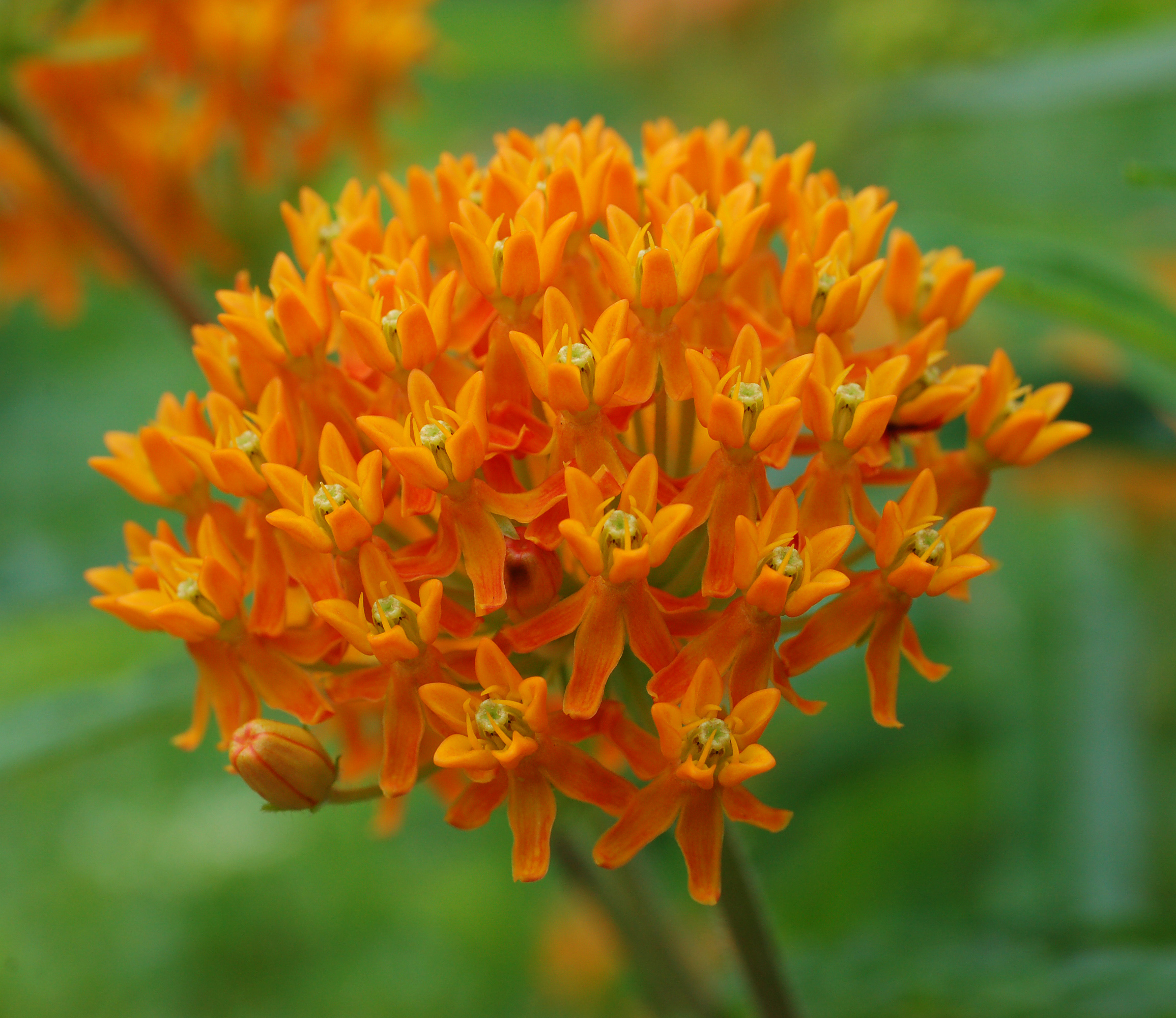
Orange flowers

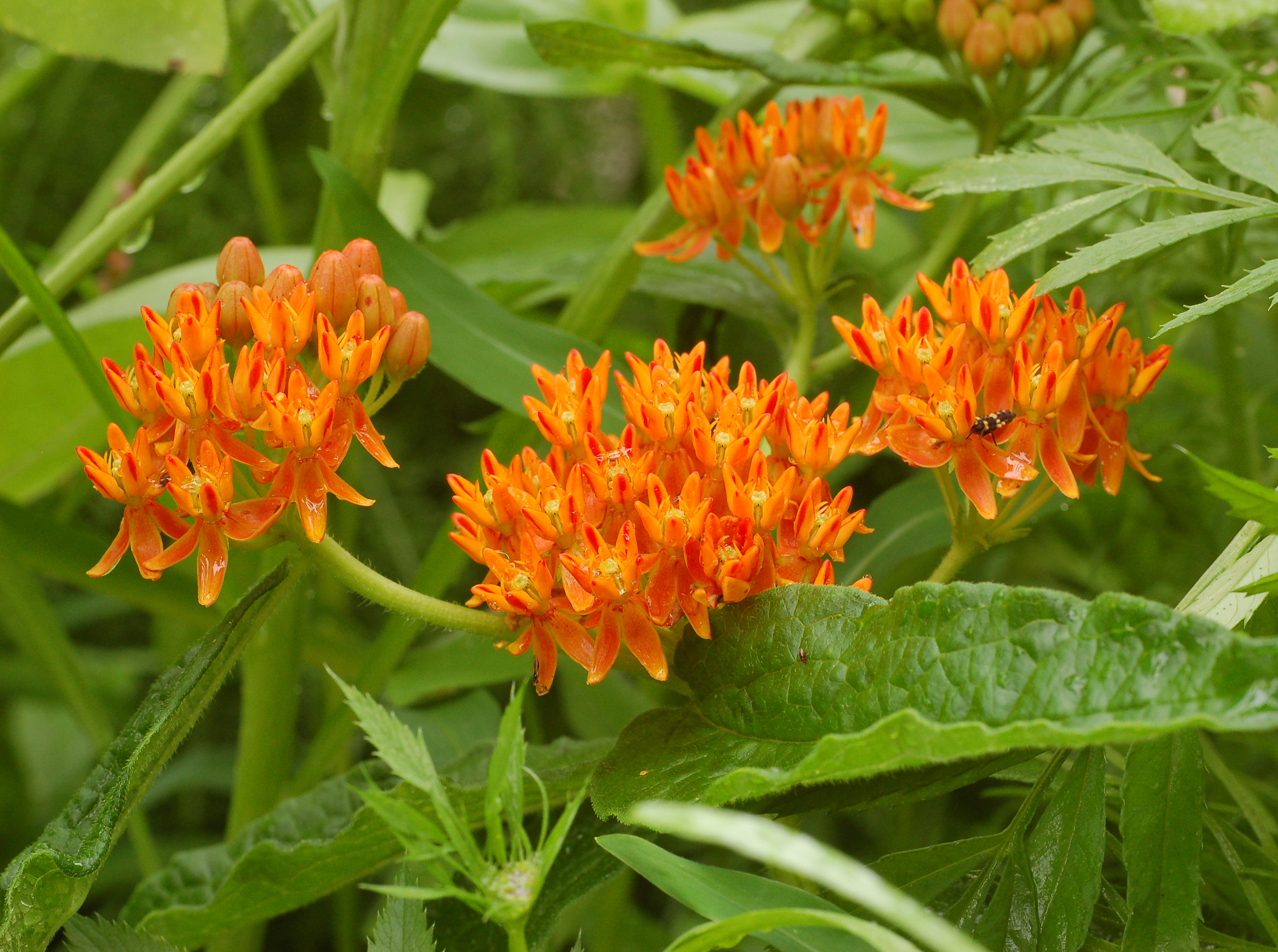
Red-striped orange flowers

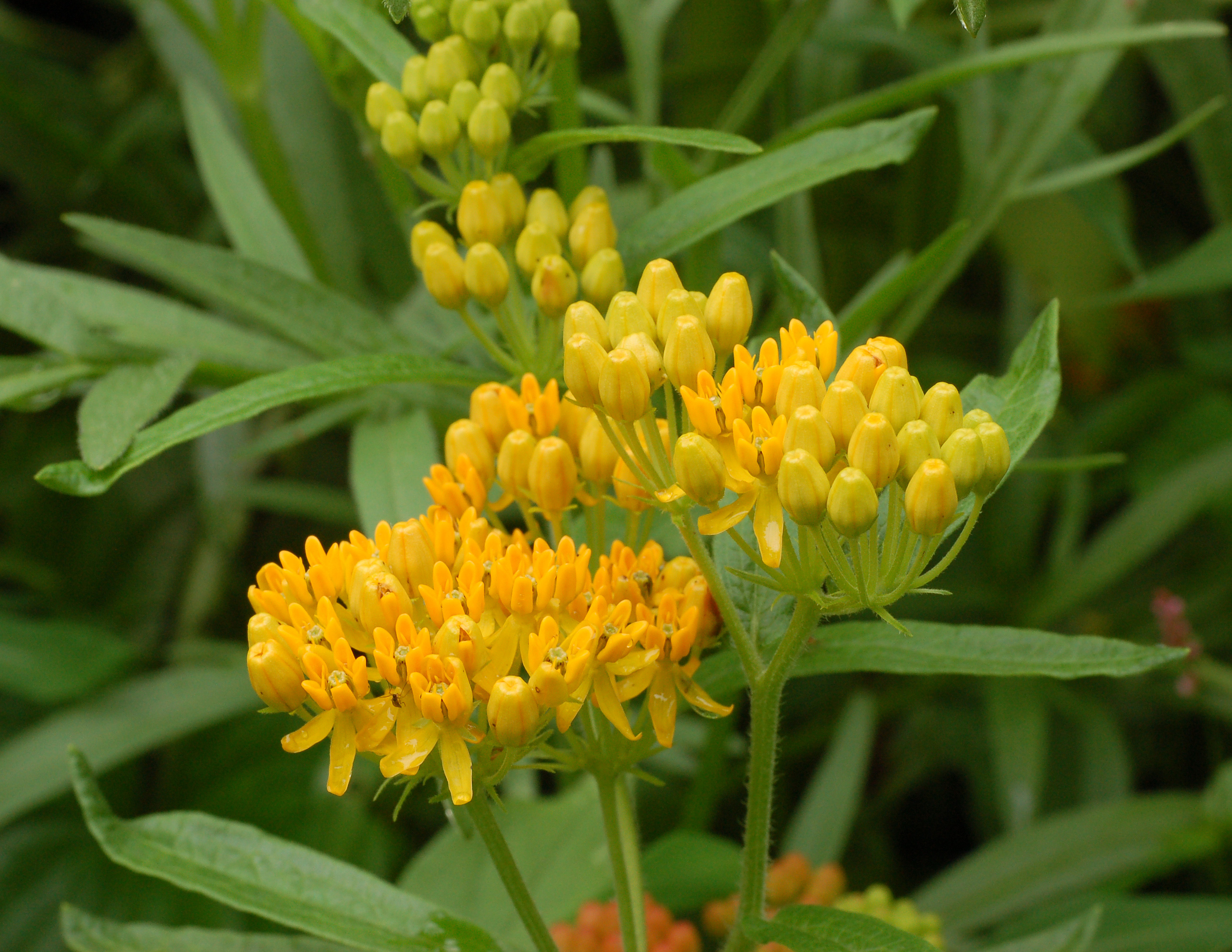
Yellow flowers

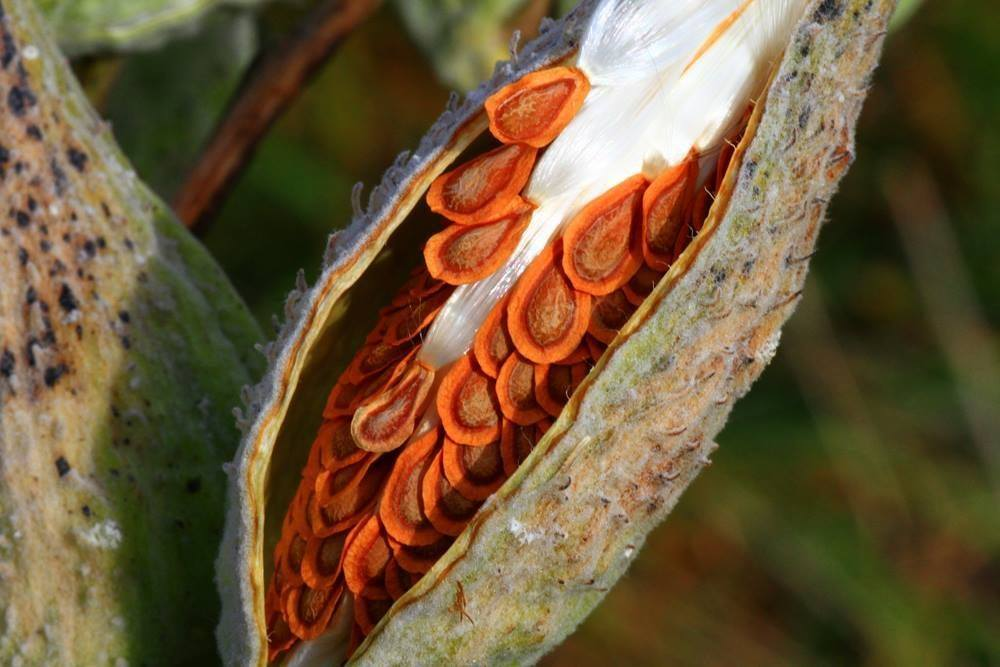
Seedpod

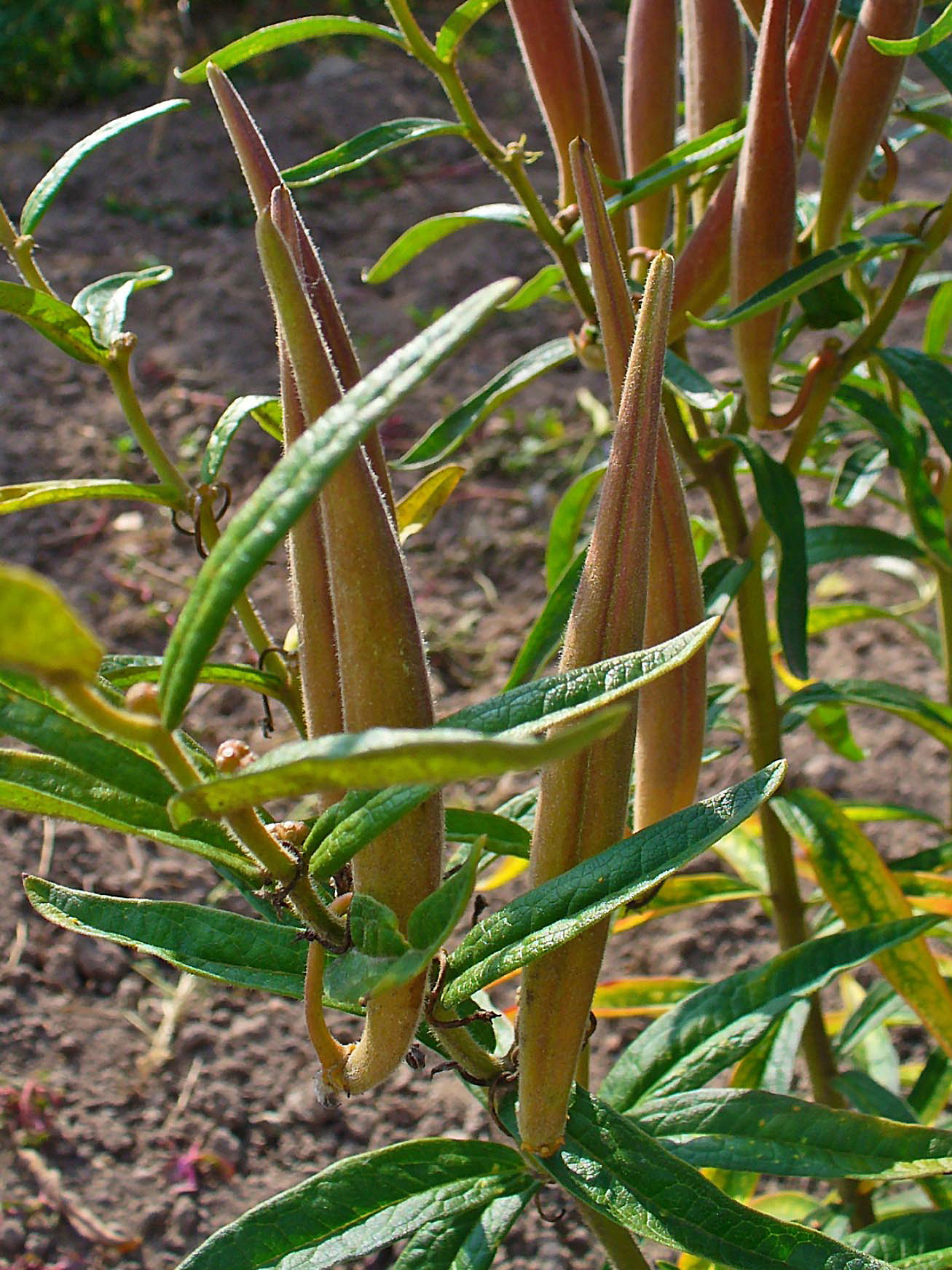
