= Butterfly tree =

Butterfly tree is a common name for several species of plants and may refer to:

- Phanera purpurea, native to India and Myanmar
- Colophospermum mopane, native to Africa
- Oroxylum indicum

== See also ==
- Butterfly bush
- Handkerchief tree
- The Butterfly Tree, a 2017 Australian film
