= Butterfly flower =

Butterfly flower may refer to:

- Asclepias syriaca
- Asclepias tuberosa
- Schizanthus spp.
- Iris japonica

== See also ==
- Butterfly bush
- Butterfly weed
