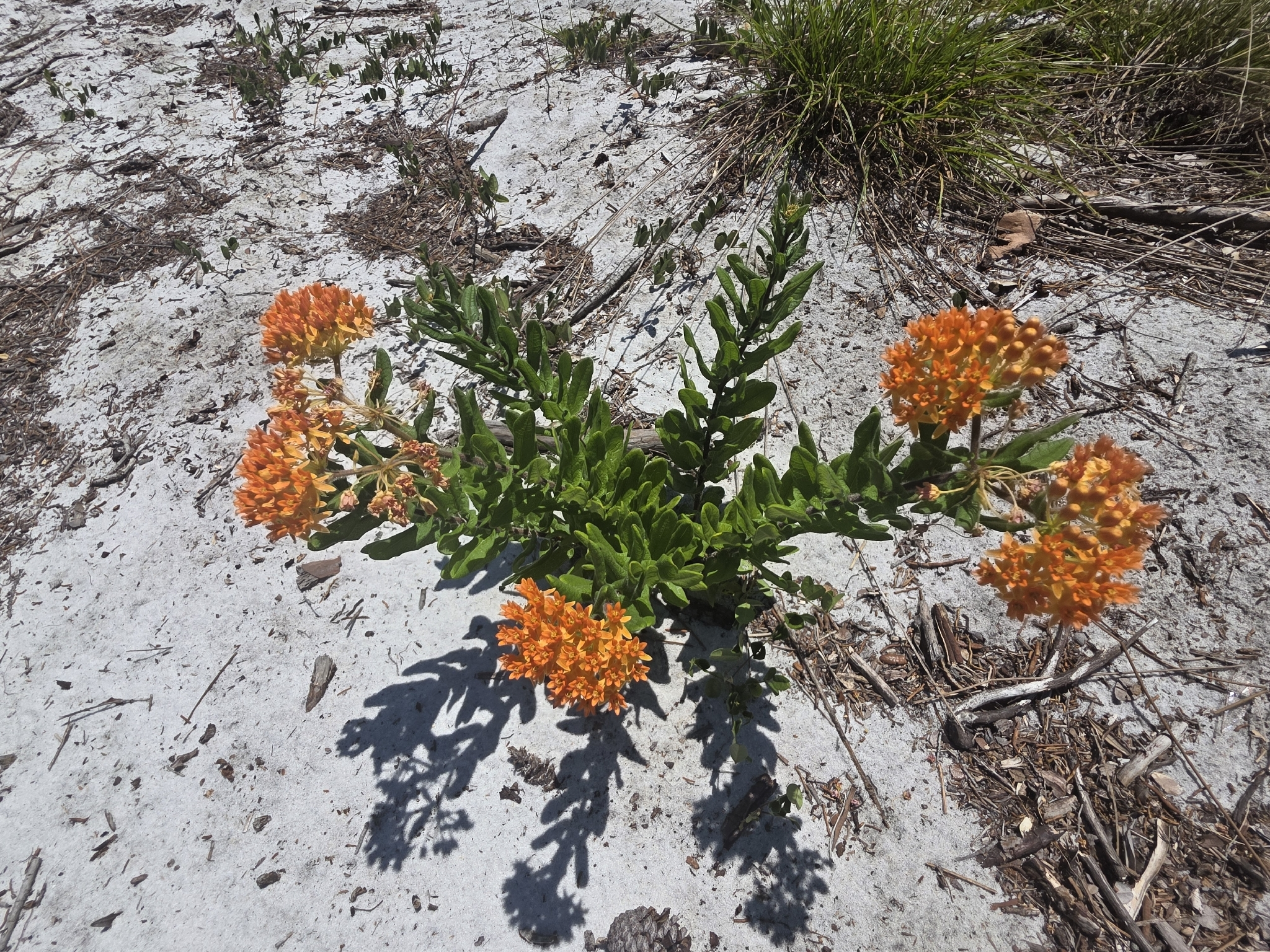

Scientific classification
- Kingdom: Plantae
- Clade: Embryophytes
- Clade: Tracheophytes
- Clade: Angiosperms
- Clade: Eudicots
- Clade: Asterids
- Order: Gentianales
- Family: Apocynaceae
- Genus: Asclepias
- Species: A. tuberosa
- Subspecies: A. t. subsp. rolfsii

Trinomial name
- Asclepias tuberosa subsp. rolfsii (Britton ex Vail) Woodson

Synonyms
- Asclepias rolfsii Britton ex Vail; Asclepias tuberosa var. rolfsii (Britton ex Vail) Shinners

= Asclepias tuberosa subsp. rolfsii =

Subspecies of flowering plant

Asclepias tuberosa subsp. rolfsii, commonly known as Rolfs' milkweed or sandhill butterflyweed, is a variety of Asclepias tuberosa native to the southeastern United States, particularly in the coastal plain regions. Like other members of the milkweed genus, it plays an important role in supporting pollinators, especially native bees and butterflies.
