= Butterfly bush =

Butterfly bush may refer to a number of different plants including:

- Buddleja
  - Buddleja davidii
  - Buddleja globosa
- Rotheca myricoides, native to Africa

== See also ==
- Butterfly flower
- Butterfly weed
