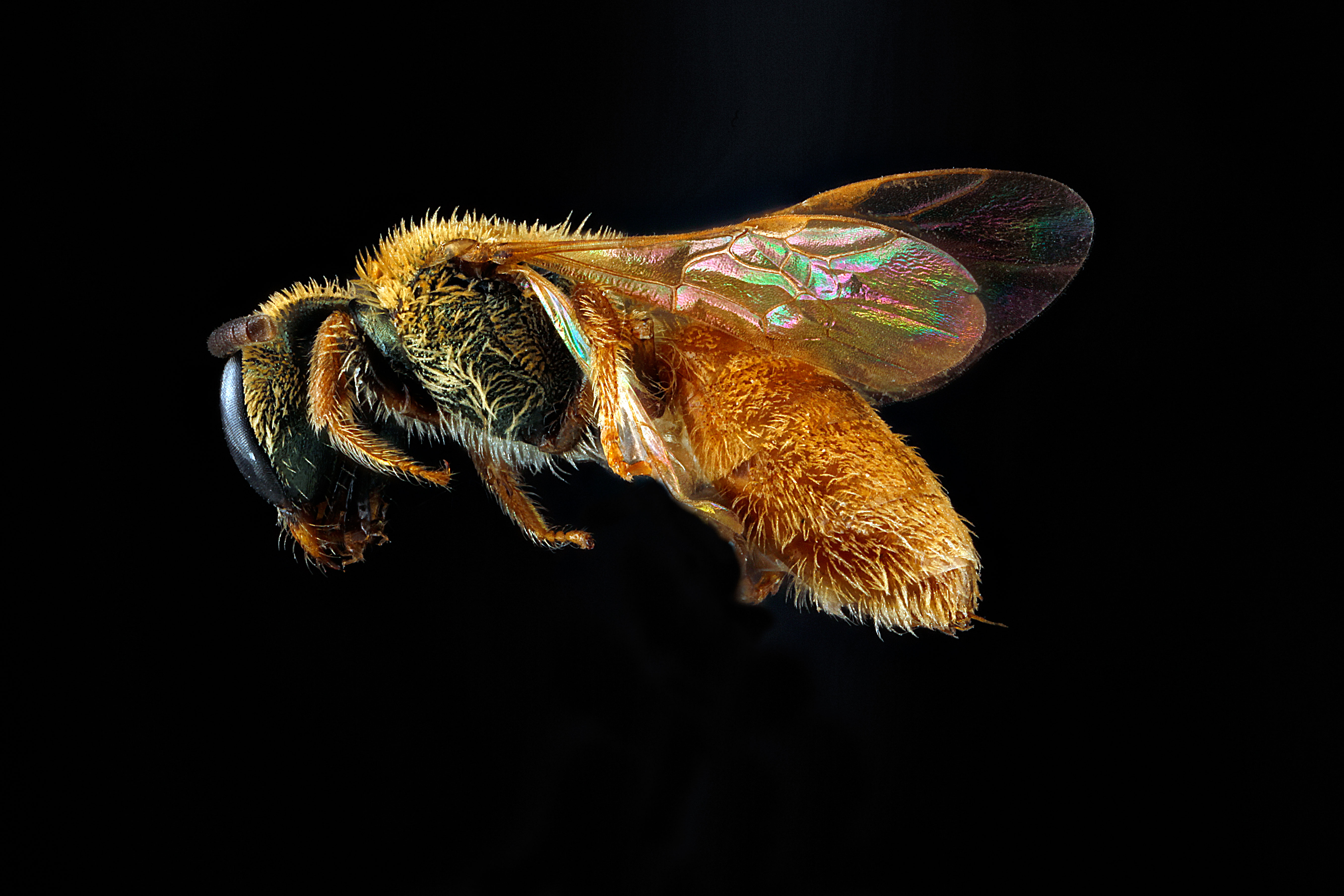

Scientific classification
- Kingdom: Animalia
- Phylum: Arthropoda
- Clade: Pancrustacea
- Class: Insecta
- Order: Hymenoptera
- Family: Halictidae
- Genus: Lasioglossum
- Species: L. vierecki

Binomial name
- Lasioglossum vierecki Crawford, 1904

= Lasioglossum vierecki =

Species of bee

Lasioglossum vierecki, also known as Dialictus vierecki and Halictus vierecki, is a sand sweat bee and is part of the family Halictidae of the order Hymenoptera. It is found in the eastern half of North America from Minnesota to the New England States down to Georgia and Louisiana and up in Manitoba and Ontario. Commonly found in sandy areas, it pollinates various flowers such as grass-leaved goldenrod (Euthamia graminifolia) and rattlesnake master (Eryngium yuccifolium).

== Taxonomy and phylogeny ==
Lasioglossum vierecki is part of the subfamily Halictinae within the hymenopteran family Halictidae. L. vierecki is the largest species within the halictid subfamily and is composed of five tribes. L. vierecki is part of tribe Halictini, which is made up of over 2000 species. Genus Lasioglossum is informally divided into two series: the Lasioglossum series and the Hemihalictus, of which L. vierecki is part of the former. It is part of the subgenus Dialictus, which is mostly composed of New World species, and is most closely related to L. gundlachii, L. umbripenne, L. parvum, and L. tegulare.

== Description and identification ==
Front of insect head diagram

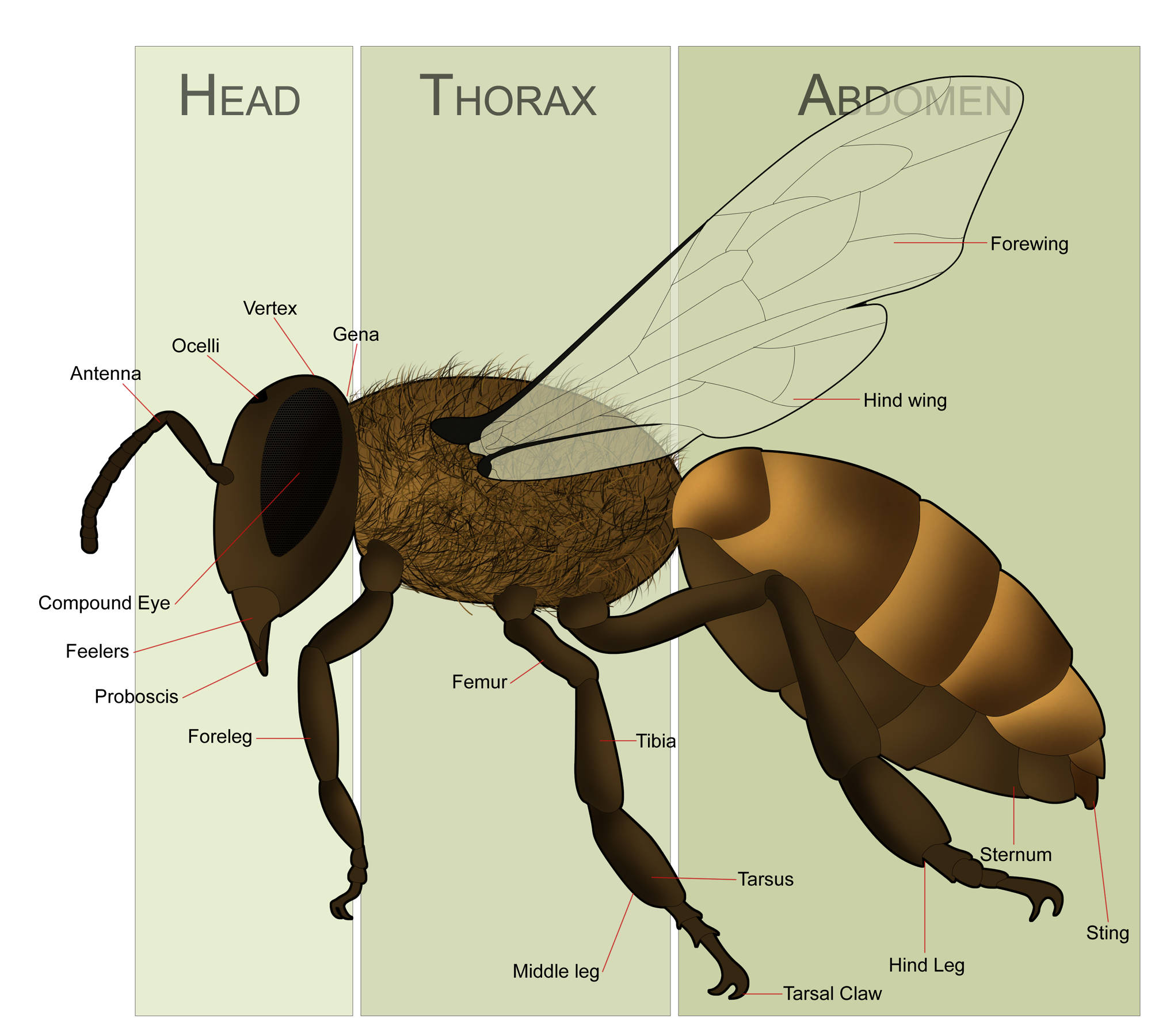
Hymenoptera morphology

L. vierecki can be distinguished by its extremely hairy, orange-yellow abdomen with clear golden yellow hair on its scutellum, and pits touching the scutellum. There are several other differences from bees that have similar colored abdomen. Its antennae is darker on the bottom half, and the rugae reaches the top of the metathorax, which has narrowly spaced punctures. Though the abdomen has punctures as well, it does not have a bronze-colored reflection and is not smooth and shiny. The mesonotum, which is the same color as the abdomen, is not smooth and polished in the middle and has small punctures. The first abdominal segment differs from other segments due to its bluer color and punctures. The legs are lighter but not polished.

=== Females ===
Female L. vierecki are distinguished by extensively yellow legs with a brown tint on the top half of the clypeus, a pale yellow-brown metasoma, and a very dense, slightly yellow tomentum on the mesosoma, metasomal terga, and head.

=== Males ===
Male L. vierecki are recognized by their smaller size and many punctures on the scutum of their middle thoracic segment.

== Distribution and habitat ==
L. vierecki is found in eastern North America from Minnesota to the New England states and south to Louisiana and Georgia as well as in Canada in Manitoba and Ontario. They are known as sand specialist bees, which means that they only nest in sand or only visit plants restricted to sand.

=== Flowers visited ===
L. vierecki pollinates several flowers throughout the eastern part of North America. In New Jersey they have been found on Ceanothus, Hydrangea, Rubus, Specularia, Helianthus, Monarda, and Solidago.

In Illinois, they have been found on:

Family	Species
Anacardiaceae	Rhus copallina
Apiaceae	Eryngium yuccifolium, Zizia aurea
Asclepiadaceae	Asclepias verticillata
Asteraceae	Eupatorium altissimum, Eupatorium perfoliatum, Euthamia graminifolia, Heterotheca subaxillaris, Hieracium caespitosum, Rudbeckia hirta, Solidago canadensis, Solidago nemoralis, Solidago speciosa, Symphyotrichum oolentangiense
Brassicaceae	Arabis lyrata
Campanulaceae	Triodanis perfoliata
Cistaceae	Helianthemum canadense
Commelinaceae	Commelina communis
Euphorbiaceae	Euphorbia corollata
Fabaceae	Dalea purpurea, Desmodium glutinosum, Lupinus perennis, Tephrosia virginiana
Hypericaceae	Hypericum perforatum, Hypericum punctatum
Lamiaceae	Monarda fistulosa, Monarda punctata, Pycnanthemum virginianum
Onagraceae	Oenothera biennis
Rosaceae	Rubus allegheniensis
Scrophulariaceae	Besseya bullii

== Behavior and ecology ==
L. vierecki is considered a solitary bee. These types of bees exhibit solitary behavior, where a female raises the entire brood by herself and lives alone in her own nest. This behavior could have evolved from eusociality.

L. vierecki is active between April and September.

== Human importance ==
Since L. vierecki and other native bees have become more important for agriculture due to the decline in population of honey bees, there are new efforts to sustain and promote these species. Some farmers are now raising native plants that these bees feed from in order to ensure that their farming practices do not negatively affect the native bee population.
