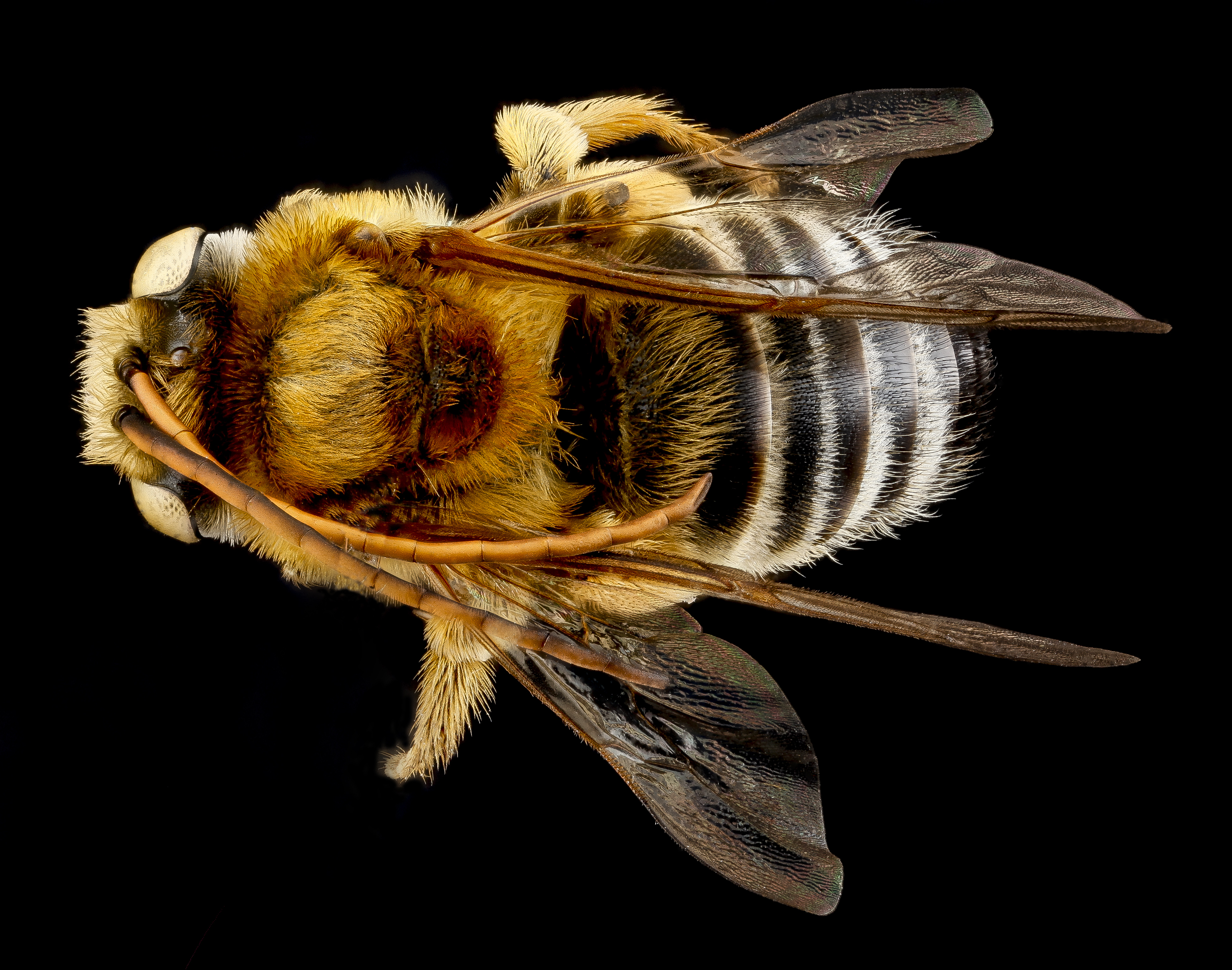

Scientific classification
- Domain: Eukaryota
- Kingdom: Animalia
- Phylum: Arthropoda
- Class: Insecta
- Order: Hymenoptera
- Family: Apidae
- Genus: Melissodes
- Species: M. communis

Binomial name
- Melissodes communis Cresson, 1878

= Melissodes communis =

Species of bee

Melissodes communis, the common long-horned bee, is a species of long-horned bee in the family Apidae. It is found in Central America and North America.

== Subspecies ==
These two subspecies belong to the species Melissodes communis:

- Melissodes communis alopex Cockerell, 1928
- Melissodes communis communis Cresson, 1878
