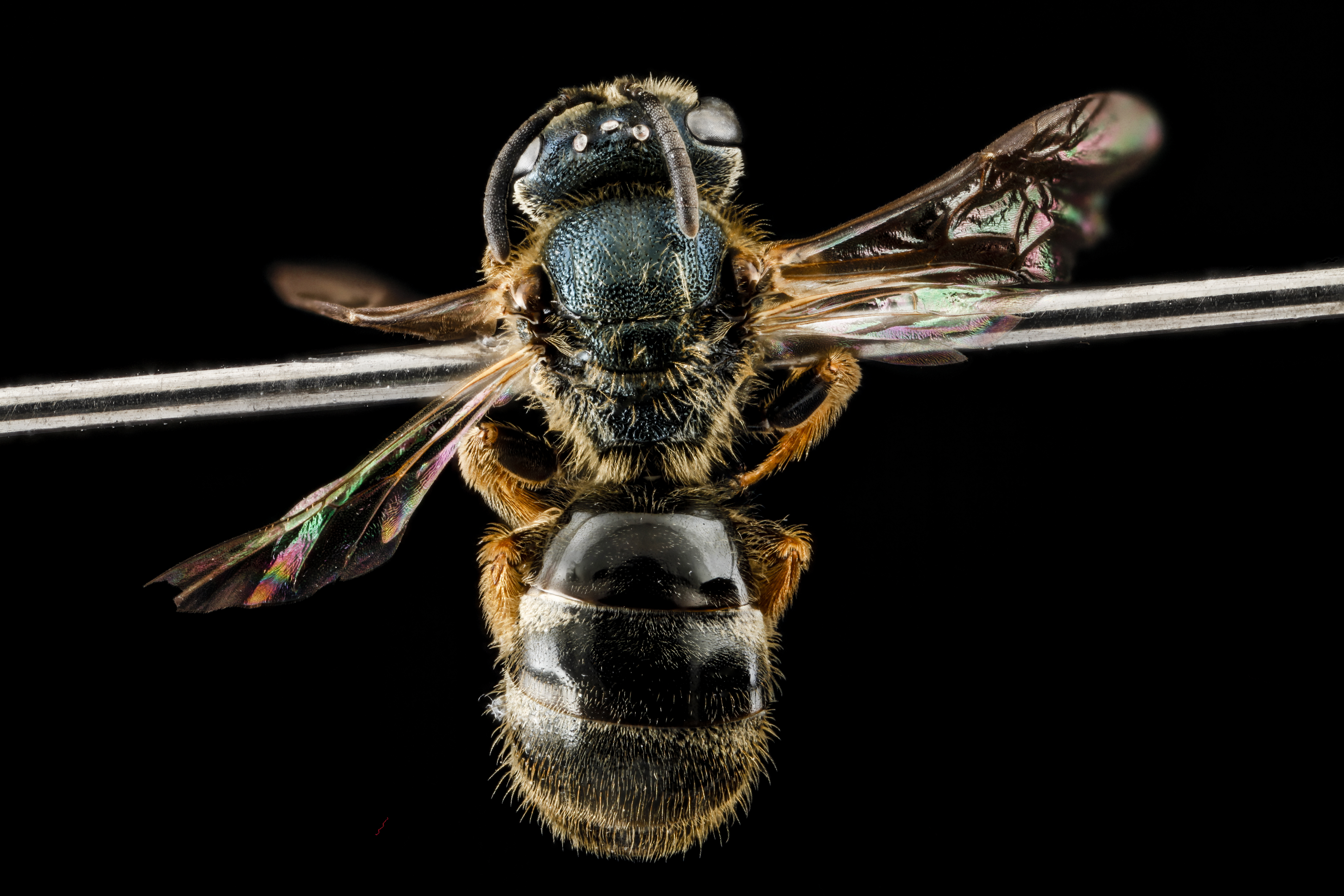

Scientific classification
- Kingdom: Animalia
- Phylum: Arthropoda
- Class: Insecta
- Order: Hymenoptera
- Family: Halictidae
- Tribe: Halictini
- Genus: Lasioglossum
- Species: L. reticulatum

Binomial name
- Lasioglossum reticulatum (Robertson, 1892)

= Lasioglossum reticulatum =

Species of bee

Lasioglossum reticulatum is a species of sweat bee in the family Halictidae.#

== Size ==
The female is up to 8 mm long and the male Lasioglossum reticulatum is about 7 mm long.

== Season ==
Its season starts in March and ends in September. In Florida its season is all year.
