= List of Augochloropsis species =

This is a list of 145 species in Augochloropsis, a genus of sweat bees in the family Halictidae.

== Augochloropsis species ==
- Augochloropsis acidalia (Smith, 1879)^{i c g}
- Augochloropsis acis (Smith, 1879)^{i c g}
- Augochloropsis aglaia (Holmberg, 1903)^{i c g}
- Augochloropsis anesidora (Doering, 1875)^{i c g}
- Augochloropsis angularis (Vachal, 1903)^{i c g}
- Augochloropsis anisitsi (Schrottky, 1908)^{i c g}
- Augochloropsis anonyma (Cockerell, 1922)^{i c g b}
- Augochloropsis anquisita (Cockerell, 1913)^{i c g}
- Augochloropsis anticlea (Schrottky, 1908)^{i c g}
- Augochloropsis apsidialis (Vachal, 1903)^{i c g}
- Augochloropsis argentina (Friese, 1908)^{i c g}
- Augochloropsis aspricordis (Vachal, 1904)^{i c g}
- Augochloropsis atripyga Strand, 1910^{i c g}
- Augochloropsis atropilosa (Friese, 1925)^{i c g}
- Augochloropsis atropos (Smith, 1879)^{i c g}
- Augochloropsis atropurpurea (Moure, 1940)^{i c g}
- Augochloropsis aureocuprea (Friese, 1910)^{i c g}
- Augochloropsis auriferina Michener, 1954^{i c g}
- Augochloropsis aurifluens (Vachal, 1903)^{i c g}
- Augochloropsis aurinota Strand, 1910^{i c g}
- Augochloropsis auriventris (Friese, 1921)^{i c g}
- Augochloropsis bari (Dominique, 1898)^{i c g}
- Augochloropsis barticana (Cockerell, 1923)^{i c g}
- Augochloropsis batesi (Cockerell, 1900)^{i c g}
- Augochloropsis berenice (Smith, 1879)^{i c g}
- Augochloropsis bertonii (Schrottky, 1909)^{i c g}
- Augochloropsis brachycephala Moure, 1943^{i c g}
- Augochloropsis brethesi (Vachal, 1903)^{i c g}
- Augochloropsis bruchi (Schrottky, 1908)^{i c}
- Augochloropsis caerulans (Vachal, 1903)^{i c g}
- Augochloropsis callichlorura (Cockerell, 1918)^{i c g}
- Augochloropsis callichroa (Cockerell, 1900)^{i c g}
- Augochloropsis calypso (Smith, 1879)^{i c g}
- Augochloropsis catamarcensis (Schrottky, 1909)^{i c g}
- Augochloropsis cataractae (Cockerell, 1930)^{i c g}
- Augochloropsis celaeno Schrottky, 1906^{i c g}
- Augochloropsis charapina (Cockerell, 1913)^{i c g}
- Augochloropsis chloera (Moure, 1940)^{i c g}
- Augochloropsis cholas (Vachal, 1903)^{i c g}
- Augochloropsis cirrhopus (Vachal, 1903)^{i c g}
- Augochloropsis cleopatra (Schrottky, 1902)^{i c g}
- Augochloropsis cockerelli Schrottky, 1909^{i c g}
- Augochloropsis cognata Moure, 1944^{i c g}
- Augochloropsis crassiceps Moure, 1947^{i c g}
- Augochloropsis crassigena Moure, 1943^{i c g}
- Augochloropsis cuprea
- Augochloropsis cupreola (Cockerell, 1900)^{i c g}
- Augochloropsis cupreotincta (Cockerell, 1900)^{i c g}
- Augochloropsis cyanea (Schrottky, 1901)^{i c g}
- Augochloropsis cyaneitarsis Strand, 1910^{i c g}
- Augochloropsis cyanescens (Friese, 1917)^{i c g}
- Augochloropsis cyclis (Vachal, 1903)^{i c g}
- Augochloropsis cytherea (Smith, 1853)^{i c g}
- Augochloropsis danielis Strand, 1910^{i c g}
- Augochloropsis deianira (Schrottky, 1910)^{i c g}
- Augochloropsis dirhipis (Vachal, 1903)^{i c g}
- Augochloropsis discors (Vachal, 1903)^{i c g}
- Augochloropsis diversipennis (Lepeletier, 1841)^{i c g}
- Augochloropsis drepanis (Vachal, 1903)^{i c g}
- Augochloropsis electra (Smith, 1853)^{i c g}
- Augochloropsis epipyrgitis (Holmberg, 1903)^{i c g}
- Augochloropsis eucalypso (Cockerell, 1900)^{i c g}
- Augochloropsis euterpe (Holmberg, 1886)^{i c g}
- Augochloropsis evibrissata Moure, 1943^{i c g}
- Augochloropsis fairchildi Michener, 1954^{i c g}
- Augochloropsis flammea (Smith, 1861)^{i c g}
- Augochloropsis fulgida
- Augochloropsis fulvofimbriata
- Augochloropsis gemmicauda (Cockerell, 1931)^{i c g}
- Augochloropsis guaranitica Strand, 1910^{i c g}
- Augochloropsis hebescens (Smith, 1879)^{i c g}
- Augochloropsis heterochroa (Cockerell, 1900)^{i c g}
- Augochloropsis holmbergi (Schrottky, 1910)^{i c g}
- Augochloropsis horticola Strand, 1910^{i c g}
- Augochloropsis huebneri (Alfken, 1930)^{i c g}
- Augochloropsis hypsipyle (Schrottky, 1909)^{i c g}
- Augochloropsis ignita (Smith, 1861)^{i c g}
- Augochloropsis illustris (Vachal, 1903)^{i c g}
- Augochloropsis imperialis (Vachal, 1903)^{i c g}
- Augochloropsis iris (Schrottky, 1902)^{i c g}
- Augochloropsis isabelae Engel, 2008^{i c g}
- Augochloropsis janeirensis (Cockerell, 1900)^{i c g}
- Augochloropsis johannae (Friese, 1917)^{i c g}
- Augochloropsis juani Strand, 1910^{i c g}
- Augochloropsis laeta (Smith, 1879)^{i c g}
- Augochloropsis leontodes (Vachal, 1904)^{i c g}
- Augochloropsis leurotricha Moure, 1943^{i c g}
- Augochloropsis liopelte (Moure, 1940)^{i c g}
- Augochloropsis luederwaldti (Moure, 1940)^{i c g}
- Augochloropsis maroniana (Cockerell, 1918)^{i c g}
- Augochloropsis melanochaeta Moure, 1950^{i c g}
- Augochloropsis mesomelas (Vachal, 1904)^{i c g}
- Augochloropsis metallica (Fabricius, 1793)^{i c g b}
- Augochloropsis monochroa (Cockerell, 1900)^{i c g}
- Augochloropsis montensis (Vachal, 1903)^{i c g}
- Augochloropsis moreirae (Cockerell, 1900)^{i c g}
- Augochloropsis multiplex (Vachal, 1903)^{i c g}
- Augochloropsis nasigerella Strand, 1910^{i c g}
- Augochloropsis nasuta Moure, 1944^{i c g}
- Augochloropsis nigra Moure, 1944^{i c g}
- Augochloropsis nitidicollis (Vachal, 1903)^{i c g}
- Augochloropsis nothus (Cockerell, 1914)^{i c g}
- Augochloropsis notophops (Cockerell, 1913)^{i c g}
- Augochloropsis notophos (Vachal, 1903)^{i c g}
- Augochloropsis ornata (Smith, 1879)^{i c g}
- Augochloropsis pallitarsis (Friese, 1917)^{i c g}
- Augochloropsis pandrosos (Schrottky, 1909)^{i c g}
- Augochloropsis paphia (Smith, 1853)^{i c g}
- Augochloropsis patens (Vachal, 1903)^{i c g}
- Augochloropsis pendens (Vachal, 1903)^{i c g}
- Augochloropsis pentheres (Vachal, 1903)^{i c g}
- Augochloropsis perimede (Schrottky, 1908)^{i c g}
- Augochloropsis pomona (Holmberg, 1903)^{i c g}
- Augochloropsis prognatha Moure, 1944^{i c g}
- Augochloropsis pronoticalis Strand, 1910^{i c g}
- Augochloropsis proserpina (Brèthes, 1909)^{i c g}
- Augochloropsis quadrans (Vachal, 1903)^{i c g}
- Augochloropsis quadripectinata Strand, 1910^{i c g}
- Augochloropsis quinquepectinata Strand, 1910^{i c g}
- Augochloropsis refulgens (Smith, 1861)^{i c g}
- Augochloropsis rotalis (Vachal, 1903)^{i c g}
- Augochloropsis rufisetis (Vachal, 1903)^{i c g}
- Augochloropsis selloi (Vachal, 1911)^{i c g}
- Augochloropsis semele (Schrottky, 1902)^{i c g}
- Augochloropsis semilaeta (Cockerell, 1923)^{i c g}
- Augochloropsis semiramis (Jörgensen, 1912)^{i c g}
- Augochloropsis sexpectinata Strand, 1910^{i c g}
- Augochloropsis smithiana (Cockerell, 1900)^{i c g}
- Augochloropsis sparsalis (Vachal, 1903)^{i c g}
- Augochloropsis spinolae (Cockerell, 1900)^{i c g}
- Augochloropsis splendida (Smith, 1853)^{i c g}
- Augochloropsis sthena Schrottky, 1906^{i c g}
- Augochloropsis sumptuosa (Smith, 1853)^{i c g b}
- Augochloropsis sympleres (Vachal, 1903)^{i c g}
- Augochloropsis taurifrons (Vachal, 1903)^{i c g}
- Augochloropsis terrestris (Vachal, 1903)^{i c g}
- Augochloropsis toralis (Vachal, 1904)^{i c g}
- Augochloropsis trinitatis (Cockerell, 1925)^{i c g}
- Augochloropsis tupacamaru (Holmberg, 1884)^{i c g}
- Augochloropsis varians (Vachal, 1903)^{i c g}
- Augochloropsis versicolor (Schrottky, 1908)^{i c g}
- Augochloropsis vesta (Smith, 1853)^{i c g}
- Augochloropsis villana Strand, 1910^{i c g}
- Augochloropsis viridana (Smith, 1861)^{i c g}
- Augochloropsis viridilustrans (Cockerell, 1927)^{i c g}
- Augochloropsis viridula
- Augochloropsis vivax (Smith, 1879)^{i c g}
- Augochloropsis wallacei (Cockerell, 1900)^{i c g}
- Augochloropsis zikani Moure, 1944^{i c g}

Data sources: i = ITIS, c = Catalogue of Life, g = GBIF, b = Bugguide.net
