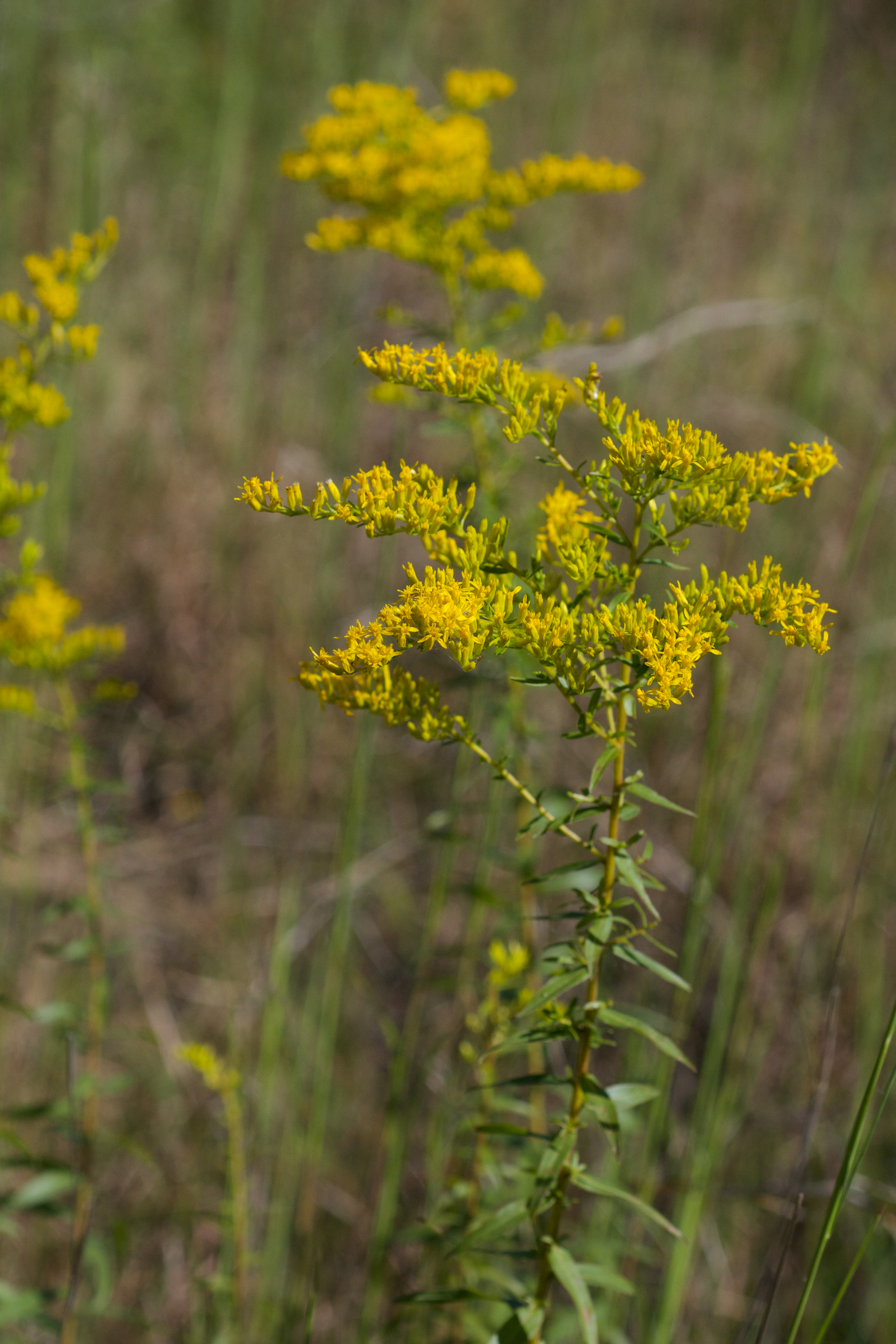

Conservation status
- Secure (NatureServe)

Scientific classification
- Kingdom: Plantae
- Clade: Tracheophytes
- Clade: Angiosperms
- Clade: Eudicots
- Clade: Asterids
- Order: Asterales
- Family: Asteraceae
- Genus: Solidago
- Species: S. odora

Binomial name
- Solidago odora Aiton

Synonyms
- Synonymy: Aster odorus (Aiton) Kuntze 1791 not All. 1785; Solidago odora var. inodora A.Gray; Solidago suaveolens Schöpf; Aster commutatus Kuntze 1891 not (Torr. & A.Gray) A.Gray 1884; Solidago chapmanii Torr. & A.Gray; Solidago odora var. chapmanii (A.Gray) Cronquist

= Solidago odora =

Species of flowering plant

Solidago odora, the sweet goldenrod, anisescented goldenrod or fragrant goldenrod, is a North American species of goldenrod within the family Asteraceae. The plant is native to the United States and Mexico, found in every coastal state from Veracruz to New Hampshire and as far inland as Ohio, Missouri, and Oklahoma. It flowers from July through October.

It can be found in habitats such as live oak woodlands, loblolly pine-sweetgum stands, and slashpine savannas.

Subspecies include:

- Solidago odora subsp. odora - most of species range
- Solidago odora subsp. chapmanii (Gray) Semple - Florida and Southern Georgia only

As a traditional medicine, Solidago odora has a variety of ethnobotanical uses, especially by the Cherokee.

The leaves, which smell of licorice when crushed, can be made into a tea.

== Galls ==
This species is host to the following insect-induced galls:

- Eurosta lateralis (Wiedemann, 1830)
- Procecidochares atra (Loew, 1862) (summer and autumn generations)
- Calycomyza solidaginis Kaltenbach, 1869

== Ecology ==
Solidago odora is insect pollinated and is recorded to have been visited in northern Florida by Augochloropsis anonyma, Augochloropsis metallica, Augochloropsis sumptuosa, and Lasioglossum apopkense .
