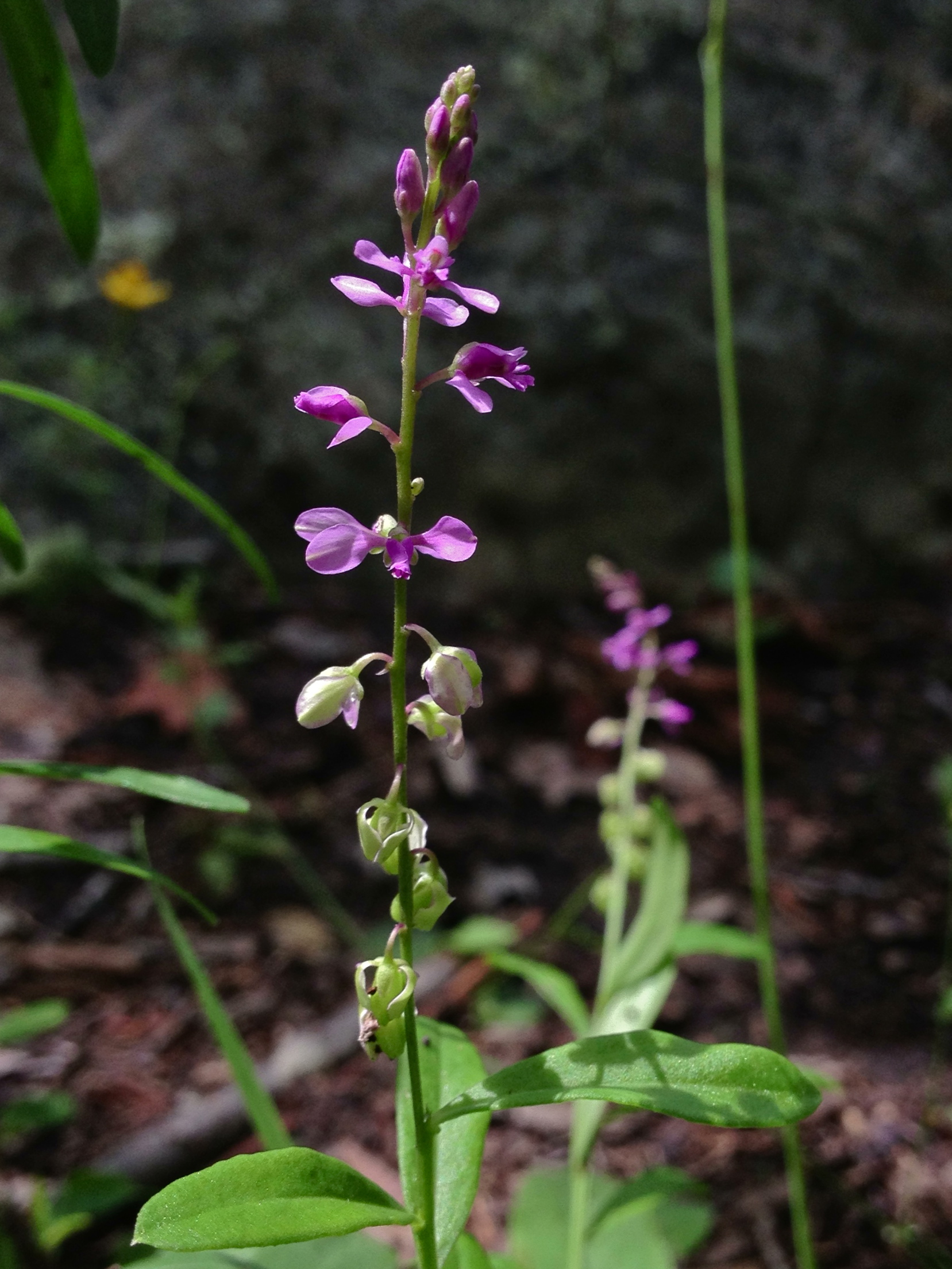
- Aboveground flowers
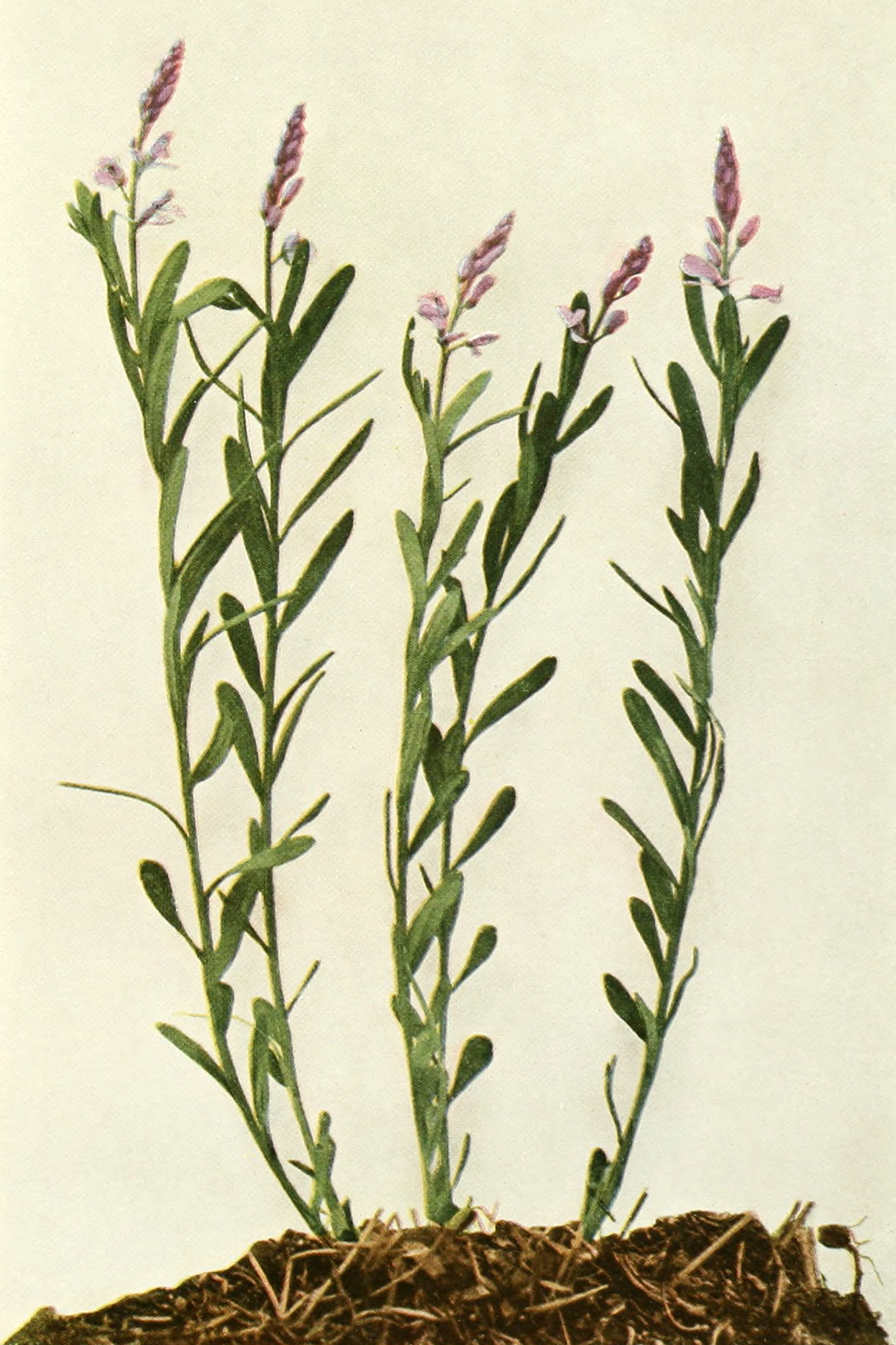
- Botanical illustration

Scientific classification
- Kingdom: Plantae
- Clade: Embryophytes
- Clade: Tracheophytes
- Clade: Spermatophytes
- Clade: Angiosperms
- Clade: Eudicots
- Clade: Rosids
- Order: Fabales
- Family: Polygalaceae
- Genus: Senega
- Species: S. polygama

Binomial name
- Senega polygama (Walter) J.F.B.Pastore & J.R.Abbott

Synonyms
- List: Anthalogea polygama (Walter) Raf.; Anthalogea polygama (Walter) Nieuwl.; Polygala aboriginum Small; Polygala polygama Walter; Polygala rubella Willd.; Polygala rugosa Raf.

= Senega polygama =

Species of flowering plant

Senega polygama, the racemed milkwort, is a species of flowering plant in the family Polygalaceae, native to eastern Canada and the central and eastern United States.

== Description ==
S. polygama is a biennial reaching 50 cm (20 in), it has pink or purple flowers, and produces additional white cleistogamous flowers underground. It has simple leaves that are alternate in arrangement. These leaves may reach a length between 1.5 and 4 centimeters.

== Habitat ==
Within the states of Florida and Georgia, S. polygama has been observed growing in habitats such as pine woodlands, sandy hill slopes, and longleaf pine-forests. It prefers sandy soils.

== Ecology ==
Senega polygama is insect pollinated and is recorded to have been visited in northern Florida by Anthidiellum notatum, Augochloropsis anonyma, Augochlorella aurata, Augochloropsis metallica, Augochloropsis sumptuosa, Ceratina , Lasioglossum reticulatum, Megachile albitarsis, Megachile exilis,Megachile georgica, Megachile petulans, and Melissodes communis .
