= Procecidocharoides flavissima =

Scientific classification
- Kingdom: Animalia
- Phylum: Arthropoda
- Class: Insecta
- Order: Diptera
- Family: Tephritidae
- Subfamily: Tephritinae
- Tribe: Cecidocharini
- Genus: Procecidocharoides
- Species: P. flavissima

Binomial name
- Procecidocharoides flavissima Foote, 1960

Species of fly

Procecidocharoides flavissima is a species of tephritid or fruit flies in the genus Pyrgotoides of the family Tephritidae.

== Distribution ==
United States.
