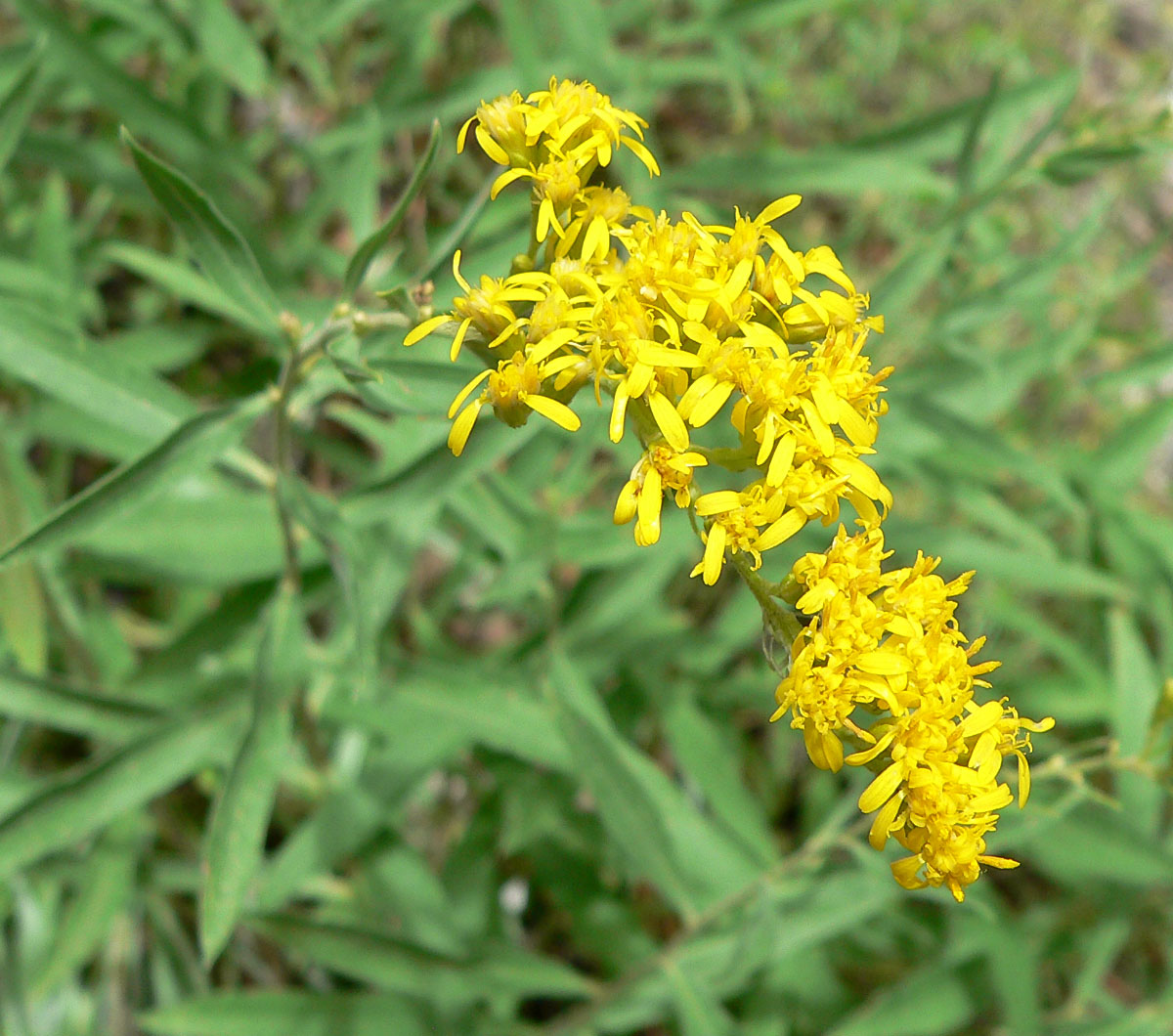
- Solidago velutina subsp. sparsiflora

Conservation status
- Secure (NatureServe)

Scientific classification
- Kingdom: Plantae
- Clade: Tracheophytes
- Clade: Angiosperms
- Clade: Eudicots
- Clade: Asterids
- Order: Asterales
- Family: Asteraceae
- Genus: Solidago
- Species: S. velutina

Binomial name
- Solidago velutina DC.

Synonyms
- Aster alamani Kuntze; Aster velutinus (DC.) Kuntze; Solidago arizonica (A. Gray) Wooton & Standl.; Solidago scabrida DC.; Solidago trinervata Greene; Solidago velutina var. nevadensis (A. Gray) C.E.S. Taylor & R.J. Taylor; Aster sparsiflorus (A.Gray) Kuntze, syn of subsp. sparsiflora; Solidago californica var. nevadensis A.Gray, syn of subsp. sparsiflora; Solidago garrettii Rydb., syn of subsp. sparsiflora; Solidago howellii Wooton & Standl., syn of subsp. sparsiflora; Solidago sparsiflora A.Gray, syn of subsp. sparsiflora

= Solidago velutina =

Species of flowering plant

Solidago velutina, the threenerve goldenrod or velvety goldenrod, is a plant species native to Mexico and to the western United States. The species has been found in southwestern Oregon, east to the Black Hills of South Dakota, and as far south as México State in the central part of the Republic of México. It is classified as a member of Subsection Nemorales.

Recent taxonomic treatments have expanded the concept of S. velutina to include S. californica and S. sparsiflora, long considered by many to be distinct species. These are now often treated as subspecies:

- Solidago velutina subsp. californica (Nutt.) Semple - California, Oregon
- Solidago velutina subsp. sparsiflora (A.Gray) Semple

Another infraspecific taxon is also recognized by some authors:

- Solidago velutina var. nevadensis (A. Gray) C.E.S. Taylor & R.J. Taylor

== Description ==
Solidago velutina has a basal rosette of leaves that are still present at flowering time. The leaves get progressively smaller higher up on the stem. Each leaf has three prominent veins running from the base to near the tip. One plant can produce as many as 500 small yellow flower heads in a large, branching array at the top of the plant.

=== Galls ===
This species is host to the following insect induced galls:

- Asteromyia carbonifera (Osten Sacken, 1862)
- Procecidochares anthracina (Doane, 1899)
- Rhopalomyia cruziana Felt, 1908

external link to gallformers
