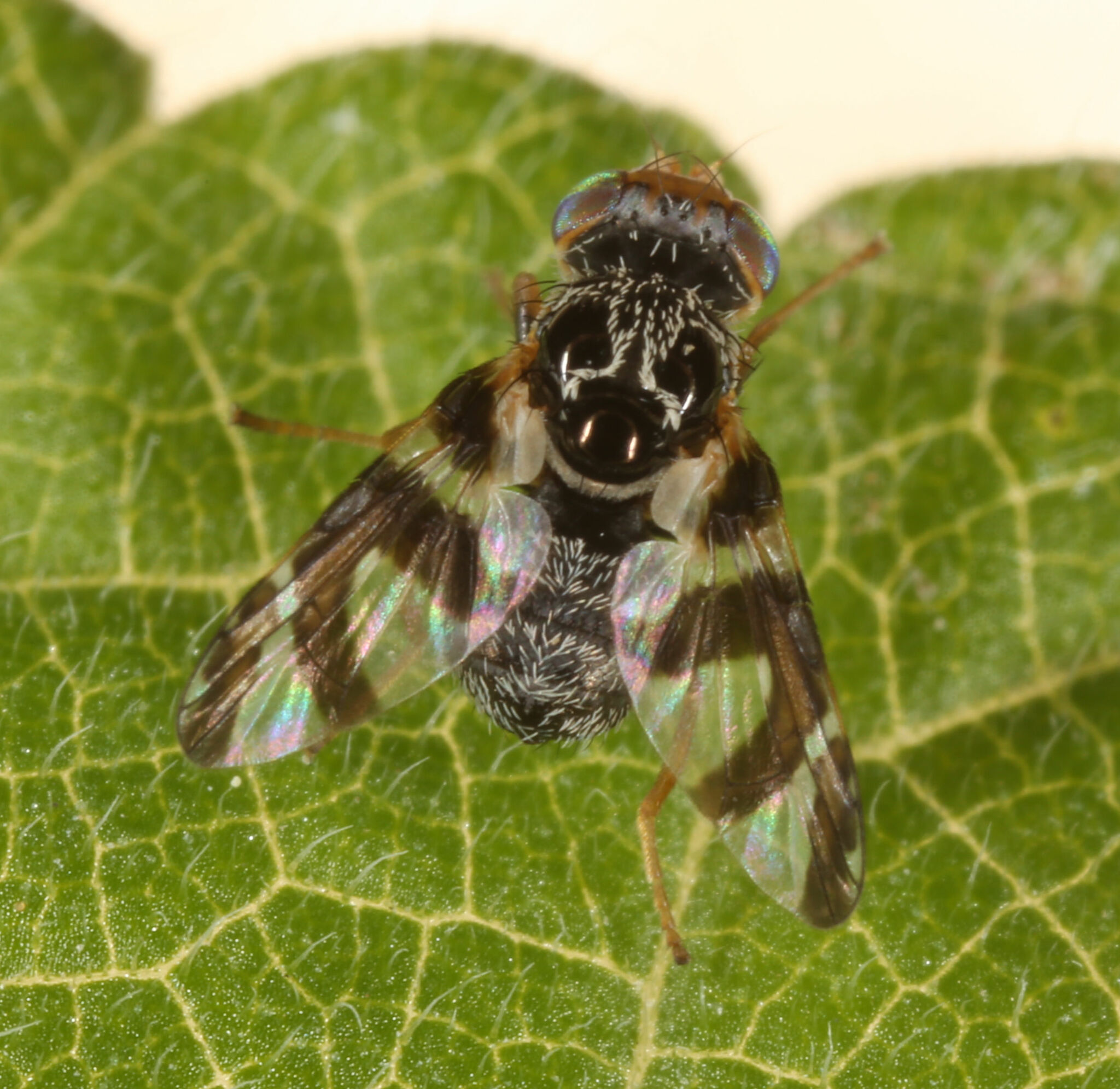

Scientific classification
- Kingdom: Animalia
- Phylum: Arthropoda
- Clade: Pancrustacea
- Class: Insecta
- Order: Diptera
- Family: Tephritidae
- Subfamily: Tephritinae
- Tribe: Cecidocharini
- Genus: Procecidochares
- Species: P. minuta

Binomial name
- Procecidochares minuta (Snow, 1894)

Synonyms
- Oedaspis minuta Snow, 1894

= Procecidochares minuta =

Species of fly

Procecidochares minuta is a species of tephritid or fruit flies in the family Tephritidae.

== Distribution ==
United States.
