= Cecidochares caliginosa =

Scientific classification
- Kingdom: Animalia
- Phylum: Arthropoda
- Class: Insecta
- Order: Diptera
- Family: Tephritidae
- Subfamily: Tephritinae
- Tribe: Cecidocharini
- Genus: Cecidochares
- Species: C. caliginosa

Binomial name
- Cecidochares caliginosa (Foote, 1960)

Synonyms
- Procecidocharoides caliginosa Foote, 1960

Species of fly

Cecidochares caliginosa is a species of tephritid or fruit flies in the genus Cecidochares of the family Tephritidae.

== Distribution ==
United States, Mexico.
