= P. utilis =

P. utilis may refer to:

- Pandanus utilis, the common screwpine, a tropical tree species native to Madagascar and Mauritius
- Procecidochares utilis, a fruit fly species

== See also ==
- Utilis (disambiguation)
