= Hetschkomyia maculipennis =

Scientific classification
- Kingdom: Animalia
- Phylum: Arthropoda
- Class: Insecta
- Order: Diptera
- Family: Tephritidae
- Subfamily: Tephritinae
- Tribe: Cecidocharini
- Genus: Hetschkomyia
- Species: H. maculipennis

Binomial name
- Hetschkomyia maculipennis Hendel, 1914

Species of fly

Hetschkomyia maculipennis is a species of tephritid or fruit flies in the genus Hetschkomyia of the family Tephritidae.

== Distribution ==
Peru.
