= Cecidochares eupatorii =

Scientific classification
- Kingdom: Animalia
- Phylum: Arthropoda
- Class: Insecta
- Order: Diptera
- Family: Tephritidae
- Subfamily: Tephritinae
- Tribe: Cecidocharini
- Genus: Cecidochares
- Species: C. eupatorii

Binomial name
- Cecidochares eupatorii (Kieffer & Jörgensen, 1910)

Synonyms
- Acidia eupatorii Kieffer & Jörgensen, 1910

Species of fly

Cecidochares eupatorii is a species of tephritid or fruit flies in the genus Cecidochares of the family Tephritidae.

== Distribution ==
Bolivia, Argentina.
