= Pyrgotoides crassipes =

Scientific classification
- Kingdom: Animalia
- Phylum: Arthropoda
- Class: Insecta
- Order: Diptera
- Family: Tephritidae
- Subfamily: Tephritinae
- Tribe: Cecidocharini
- Genus: Pyrgotoides
- Species: P. crassipes

Binomial name
- Pyrgotoides crassipes Curran, 1934

Synonyms
- Pyrgotoides clavipes Curran, 1934

Species of fly

Pyrgotoides crassipes is a species of tephritid or fruit flies in the genus Pyrgotoides of the family Tephritidae.

== Distribution ==
Panama.
