= Cecidochares delta =

Scientific classification
- Kingdom: Animalia
- Phylum: Arthropoda
- Class: Insecta
- Order: Diptera
- Family: Tephritidae
- Subfamily: Tephritinae
- Tribe: Cecidocharini
- Genus: Cecidochares
- Species: C. delta

Binomial name
- Cecidochares delta (Hendel, 1914)

Synonyms
- Procecidochares delta Hendel, 1914

Species of fly

Cecidochares delta is a species of tephritid or fruit flies in the genus Cecidochares of the family Tephritidae.

== Distribution ==
Ecuador, Peru, Chile.
