= Ostracocoelia mirabilis =

Scientific classification
- Kingdom: Animalia
- Phylum: Arthropoda
- Class: Insecta
- Order: Diptera
- Family: Tephritidae
- Subfamily: Tephritinae
- Tribe: Cecidocharini
- Genus: Ostracocoelia
- Species: O. mirabilis

Binomial name
- Ostracocoelia mirabilis Giglio-Tos, 1893

Synonyms
- Ceratitoedaspis palpalis Aczél, 1953

Species of fly

Ostracocoelia mirabilis is a species of tephritid or fruit flies in the genus Ostracocoelia of the family Tephritidae.

== Distribution ==
Mexico, South to Costa Rica.
