= Cecidocharella elegans =

Scientific classification
- Kingdom: Animalia
- Phylum: Arthropoda
- Class: Insecta
- Order: Diptera
- Family: Tephritidae
- Subfamily: Tephritinae
- Tribe: Cecidocharini
- Genus: Cecidocharella
- Species: C. elegans

Binomial name
- Cecidocharella elegans Hering, 1941

Synonyms
- Cecidocharella ogloblini Aczel, 1953

Species of fly

Cecidocharella elegans is a species of tephritid or fruit flies in the genus Tomoplagia of the family Tephritidae.

== Distribution ==
Brazil.
