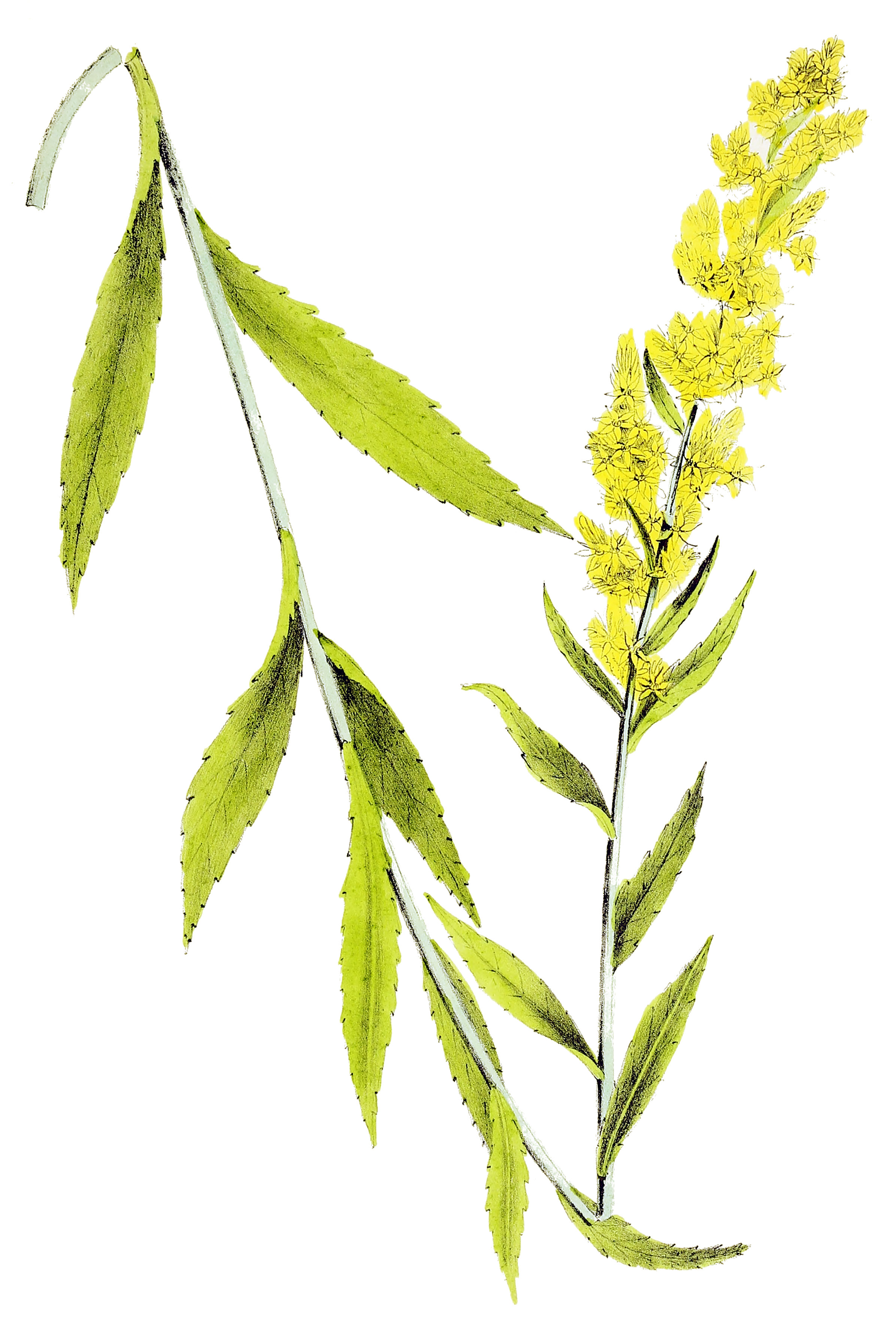

Scientific classification
- Kingdom: Plantae
- Clade: Tracheophytes
- Clade: Angiosperms
- Clade: Eudicots
- Clade: Asterids
- Order: Asterales
- Family: Asteraceae
- Genus: Solidago
- Species: S. stricta

Binomial name
- Solidago stricta W. T. Aiton (1789)

= Solidago stricta =

Species of flowering plant

Solidago stricta, commonly known as wand goldenrod or willowleaf goldenrod, is a North American species of goldenrod in the family Asteraceae. A herbaceous perennial dicot it grows in the southern and southeastern United States. It has been described as having a wand like appearance and grows in sandy pine barren and wet coastal plain habitats. It blooms August to November.

This species was first described by British botanist, William Townsend Aiton in 1789.

== Galls ==
This species is host to the following insect induced gall:

- Procecidochares polita (Loew, 1862)

external link to gallformers
