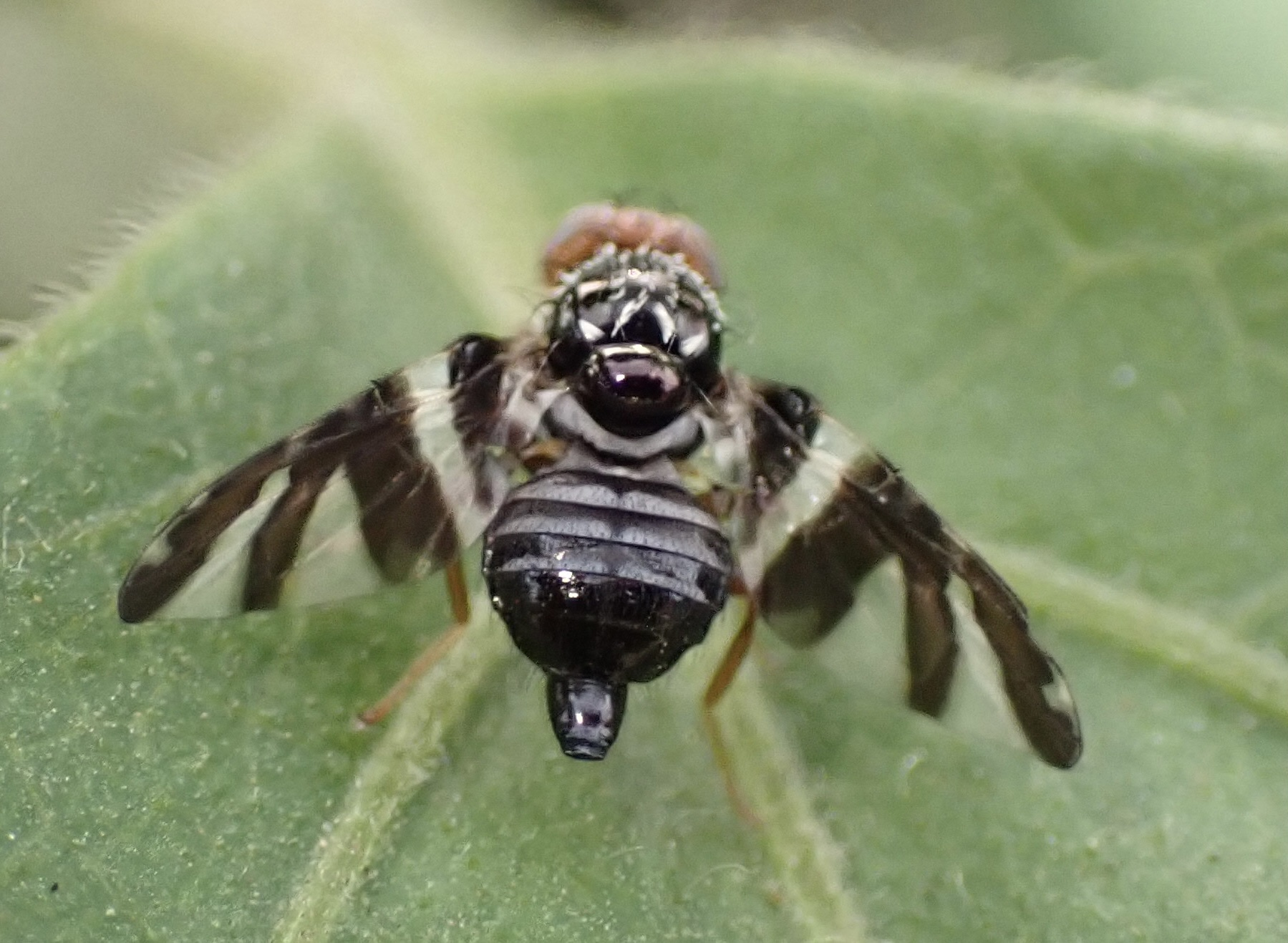

Scientific classification
- Kingdom: Animalia
- Phylum: Arthropoda
- Clade: Pancrustacea
- Class: Insecta
- Order: Diptera
- Family: Tephritidae
- Subfamily: Tephritinae
- Tribe: Cecidocharini
- Genus: Cecidochares
- Species: C. connexa

Binomial name
- Cecidochares connexa (Macquart, 1848)

Synonyms
- Urophora connexa Macquart, 1848; Trypeta nigerrima Loew, 1862; Oedaspis leucotricha Schiner, 1868

= Cecidochares connexa =

Species of fly

Cecidochares connexa is a species of tephritid or fruit fly in the family Tephritidae. It is used for biocontrol of the invasive shrub Chromolaena odorata.

== Distribution ==
Venezuela, Argentina, Brazil.
