= Neorhagoletis latifrons =

Scientific classification
- Kingdom: Animalia
- Phylum: Arthropoda
- Class: Insecta
- Order: Diptera
- Family: Tephritidae
- Subfamily: Tephritinae
- Tribe: Cecidocharini
- Genus: Neorhagoletis
- Species: N. latifrons

Binomial name
- Neorhagoletis latifrons Hendel, 1914

Species of fly

Neorhagoletis latifrons is a species of tephritid or fruit flies in the genus Neorhagoletis of the family Tephritidae.

== Distribution ==
Bolivia.
