= Cecidochares fluminensis =

Scientific classification
- Kingdom: Animalia
- Phylum: Arthropoda
- Class: Insecta
- Order: Diptera
- Family: Tephritidae
- Subfamily: Tephritinae
- Tribe: Cecidocharini
- Genus: Cecidochares
- Species: C. fluminensis

Binomial name
- Cecidochares fluminensis (Lima, 1934)

Synonyms
- Procecidochares fluminensis Lima, 1934

Species of fly

Cecidochares fluminensis is a species of tephritid or fruit flies in the genus Cecidochares of the family Tephritidae.

== Distribution ==
Mexico, Guatemala, Costa Rica, Panama, Venezuela, Trinidad, Brazil.
