= Procecidocharoides pullata =

Scientific classification
- Kingdom: Animalia
- Phylum: Arthropoda
- Class: Insecta
- Order: Diptera
- Family: Tephritidae
- Subfamily: Tephritinae
- Tribe: Cecidocharini
- Genus: Procecidocharoides
- Species: P. pullata

Binomial name
- Procecidocharoides pullata Foote, 1960

Species of fly

Procecidocharoides pullata is a species of tephritid or fruit flies in the genus Procecidocharoides of the family Tephritidae.

== Distribution ==
United States, Mexico.
