= Pyrgotoides peruviana =

Scientific classification
- Kingdom: Animalia
- Phylum: Arthropoda
- Class: Insecta
- Order: Diptera
- Family: Tephritidae
- Subfamily: Tephritinae
- Tribe: Cecidocharini
- Genus: Pyrgotoides
- Species: P. peruviana

Binomial name
- Pyrgotoides peruviana (Korytkowski, 1976)

Synonyms
- Gerrhoceras peruviana Korytkowski, 1976

Species of fly

Pyrgotoides peruviana is a species of tephritid or fruit flies in the genus Pyrgotoides of the family Tephritidae.

== Distribution ==
Peru.
