= Cecidochares latigenis =

Scientific classification
- Kingdom: Animalia
- Phylum: Arthropoda
- Class: Insecta
- Order: Diptera
- Family: Tephritidae
- Subfamily: Tephritinae
- Tribe: Cecidocharini
- Genus: Cecidochares
- Species: C. latigenis

Binomial name
- Cecidochares latigenis Hendel, 1914

Species of fly

Cecidochares latigenis is a species of tephritid or fruit flies in the genus Cecidochares of the family Tephritidae.

== Distribution ==
Bolivia.
