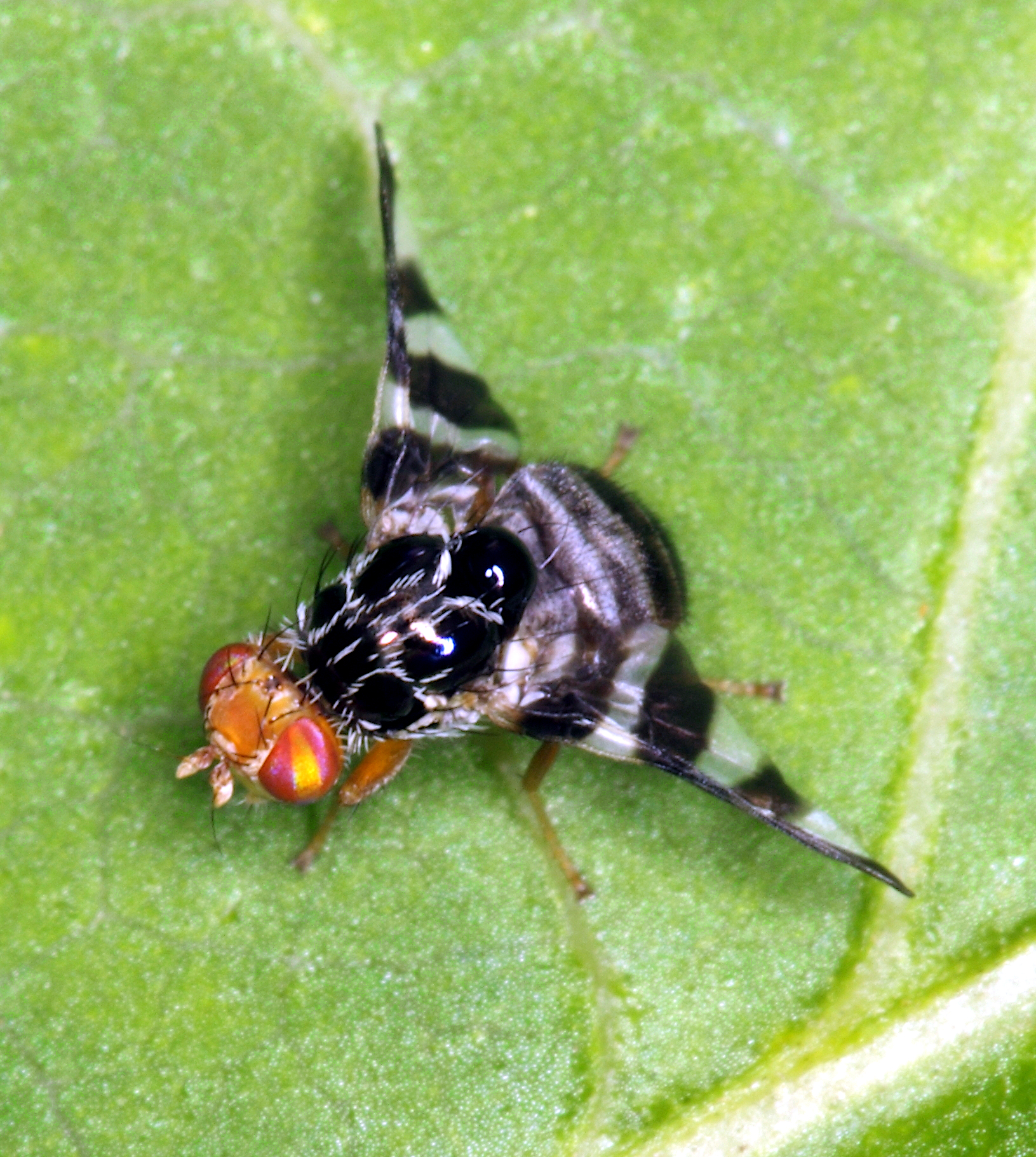
- Procecidochares atra

Scientific classification
- Kingdom: Animalia
- Phylum: Arthropoda
- Clade: Pancrustacea
- Class: Insecta
- Order: Diptera
- Family: Tephritidae
- Subfamily: Tephritinae
- Tribe: Cecidocharini
- Genus: Procecidochares; Hendel, 1914

Type species
- Trypeta atra Loew, 1862

Synonyms
- Oedaspis Williston, 1896; Oedaspissolidago Patton, 1897; Oediaspis Thompson, 1907; Callachna Aldrich, 1929; Prececidochares Aldrich, 1929

= Procecidochares =

Genus of flies

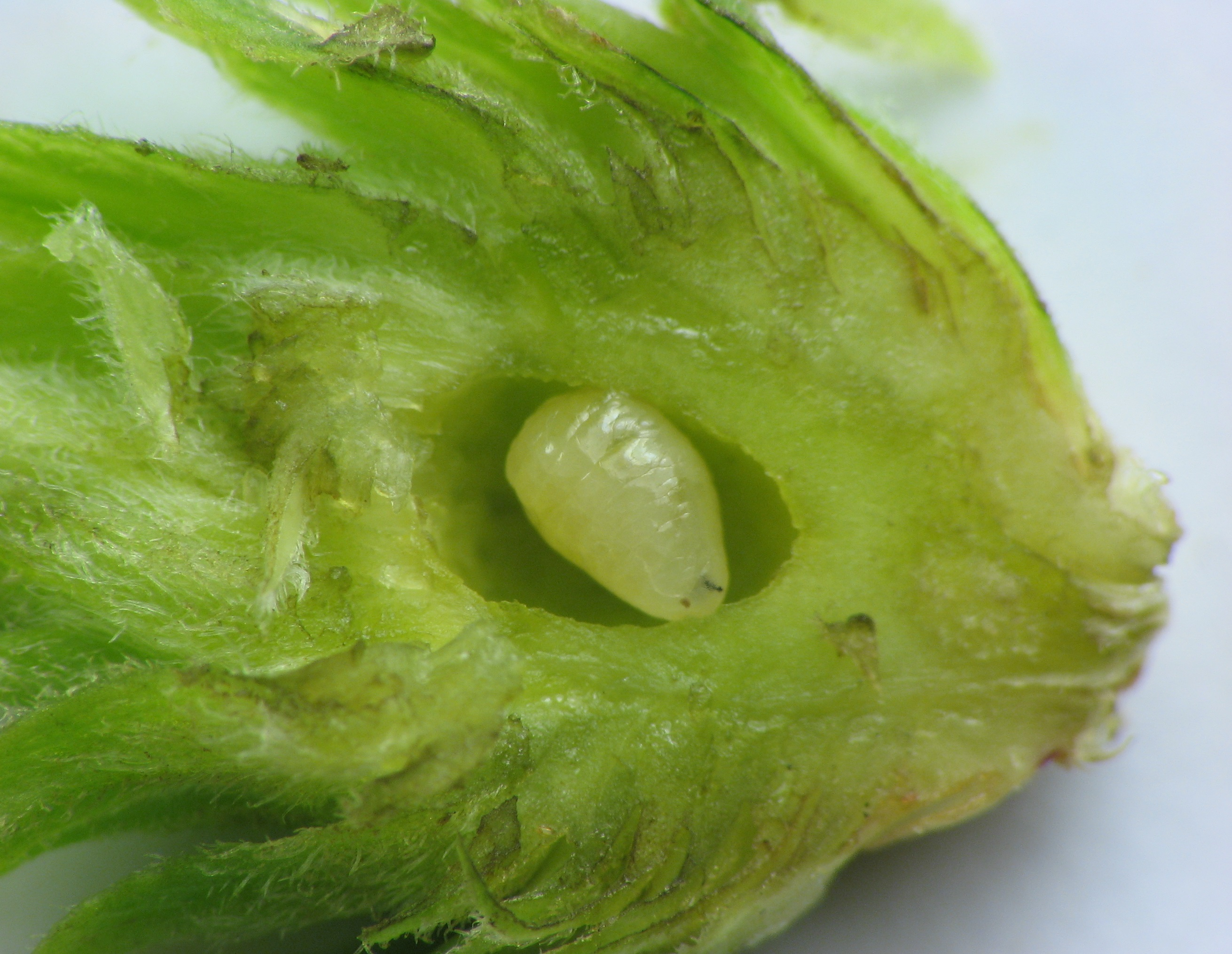
Larva of P. atra in goldenrod gall

Procecidochares is a genus of tephritid or fruit flies in the family Tephritidae.

== Species ==
- Procecidochares alani Steyskal, 1974
- Procecidochares anthracina (Doane, 1899)
- Procecidochares atra (Loew, 1862)
- Procecidochares australis Aldrich, 1929
- Procecidochares blanci Goeden & Norrbom, 2001
- Procecidochares blantoni Hering, 1940
- Procecidochares flavipes Aldrich, 1929
- Procecidochares gibba (Loew, 1873)
- Procecidochares grindeliae Aldrich, 1929
- Procecidochares kristineae Goeden, 1997
- Procecidochares lisae Goeden, 1997
- Procecidochares minuta (Snow, 1894)
- Procecidochares montana (Snow, 1894)
- Procecidochares pleuralis Aldrich, 1929
- Procecidochares pleuritica Hendel, 1914
- Procecidochares polita (Loew, 1862)
- Procecidochares stonei Blanc & Foote, 1961
- Procecidochares suttoni Norrbom, 2010
- Procecidochares utilis Stone, 1947
