= Procecidochares stonei =

Scientific classification
- Kingdom: Animalia
- Phylum: Arthropoda
- Clade: Pancrustacea
- Class: Insecta
- Order: Diptera
- Family: Tephritidae
- Subfamily: Tephritinae
- Tribe: Cecidocharini
- Genus: Procecidochares
- Species: P. stonei

Binomial name
- Procecidochares stonei Blanc & Foote, 1961

Species of fly

Procecidochares stonei is a species of tephritid or fruit flies in the genus Procecidochares of the family Tephritidae. It is found in the United States.
