= Procecidocharoides penelope =

Scientific classification
- Kingdom: Animalia
- Phylum: Arthropoda
- Class: Insecta
- Order: Diptera
- Family: Tephritidae
- Subfamily: Tephritinae
- Tribe: Cecidocharini
- Genus: Procecidocharoides
- Species: P. penelope

Binomial name
- Procecidocharoides penelope (Osten Sacken, 1877)

Synonyms
- Trypeta penelope Osten Sacken, 1877

Species of fly

Procecidocharoides penelope is a species of tephritid or fruit flies in the genus Procecidocharoides of the family Tephritidae.

== Distribution ==
Canada, United States.
