= Pyrgotoides paradoxus =

Scientific classification
- Kingdom: Animalia
- Phylum: Arthropoda
- Class: Insecta
- Order: Diptera
- Family: Tephritidae
- Subfamily: Tephritinae
- Tribe: Cecidocharini
- Genus: Pyrgotoides
- Species: P. paradoxus

Binomial name
- Pyrgotoides paradoxus (Hering, 1942)

Synonyms
- Gerrhoceras paradoxa Hering, 1942

Species of fly

Pyrgotoides paradoxus is a species of tephritid or fruit flies in the genus Pyrgotoides of the family Tephritidae.

== Distribution ==
Bolivia.
