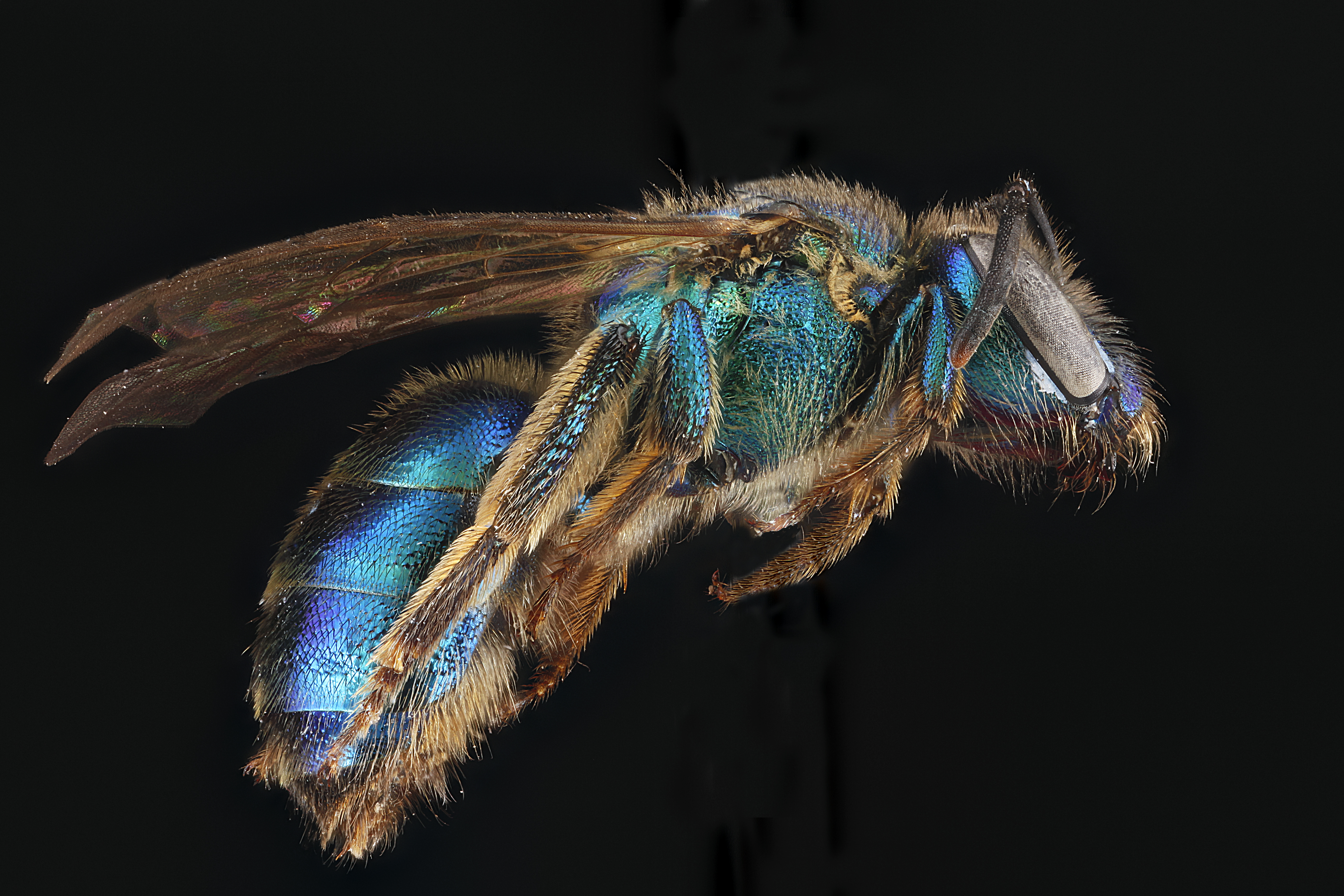
- Augochloropsis anonyma

Scientific classification
- Kingdom: Animalia
- Phylum: Arthropoda
- Clade: Pancrustacea
- Class: Insecta
- Order: Hymenoptera
- Family: Halictidae
- Subfamily: Halictinae
- Tribe: Augochlorini
- Genus: Augochloropsis; Cockerell, 1897

Diversity
- at least 140 species

= Augochloropsis =

Genus of bees

Augochloropsis is a genus of brilliant metallic, often blue-green, sweat bees in the family Halictidae. There are at least 140 described species in Augochloropsis.

== Description and identification ==
Species of the genus Augochloropsis are generally between 8 and 12 mm long and metallic, typically bright green or blue in color, with some exceptions such as gold, red, or purple.

Augochloropsis species can be differentiated from other Augochlorini at the genus level by the tegulae that are punctate, D-shaped, and bent inwards.

== Geographic distribution ==
The genus Augochloropsis is restricted to the New World, and the vast majority of species are found in the tropical and subtropical regions. Several Augochloropsis species are found in the temperate regions of North America (A. anonyma, A. cuprea, A.fulgida, A. fulvofimbriata, A. metallica, A. sumptuosa, and A. viridula), but no species have managed to successfully exploit niches present in the subarctic zone.

== Nesting behavior ==
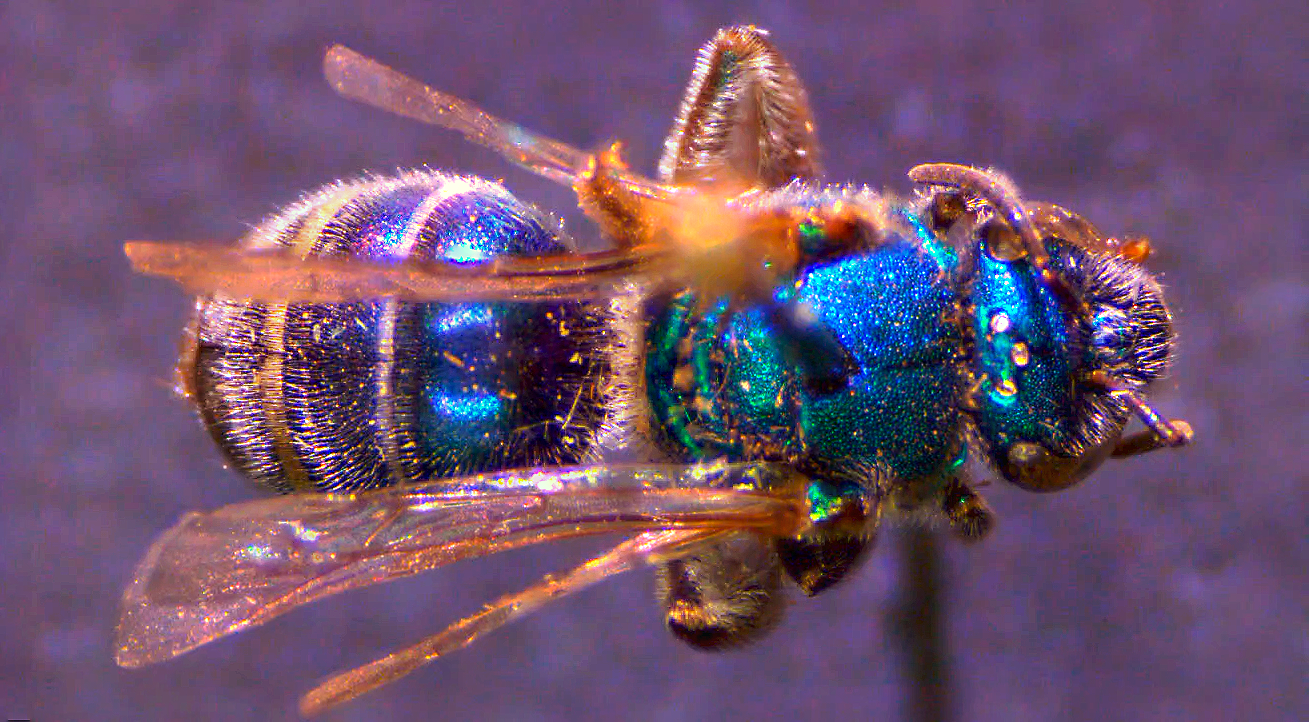
Augochloropsis fulgida

Augochloropsis nests begin with one long main burrow, dug out of soft ground, that extends straight down. This main burrow has a lateral burrow that extends outward horizontally, perpendicular to the main. Cells all hang vertically down from this one lateral burrow, a sort of clustering that is common for all genera in the tribe Augochlorini. Aside from this, the overall structure of one main burrow and one lateral burrow is considered unique within the tribe.

== Sociality ==
A broad spectrum of social behaviors have been observed in the tropical Augochloropsis species. These range from solitary, to communal, semisocial, and even eusocial nesting behavior. A few faunal studies have looked at North American species as well. A. sumptuosa has been studied in New Jersey and Kansas and has been found to be either communal or semisocial. Some species have been observed to nest in aggregations, where the openings of several nests are located within just centimeters of each other.

Some evidence of division of labor or partitioning of social roles to some extent has been observed within this genus. An excavated nest of A. metallica in Michigan led to the discovery of two female nest-mates with different levels of ovarian development that were determined not to be due simply to the age of the individuals. This was interpreted as strongly indicative of division of labor within this species, suggesting at least that individuals have varying levels of reproductive responsibility within a nest. This may be a larger pattern found within the social species of this genus.

There is a large amount of behavioral variability observed within augochlorine bees. Species within this tribe can also display polyethism, or differences in sociality and work activity among different members of a species. Unlike certain species that may be reliably eusocial or reliably solitary, members of Augochloropsis show behavioral plasticity.

== Diet ==
Augochloropsis are classified as polylectic, a term which indicates that these species are broad generalists that collect pollen from multiple families of plants. Certain life history traits of bees are actually known to predict polylecty, including social lifestyles, long windows of adult activity, and producing more than two generations of offspring a year. Some of these traits are often seen in different Augochloropsis species. For example, Augochloropsis anonyma adults are active between April and September in the northern portion of its range and year-round within its range in southern Florida. Having this long window of activity makes this species more likely to forage from a large number of different plant taxa. Another species, Augochloropsis iris, which is native to South America, is primitively eusocial, and engages in three rounds of brood production over the course of a year, which correspond to the traits listed above that often promote wider diet breadth.

=== Floral associations ===
Augochloropsis anonyma has been recorded in association with Baccharis, Bidens, Cirsium, Erigeron, Helenium, Ilex, Linaria, Melilotus, Metopium, Ocimum, Polygonurn, Pycnanthemum, Rhus, Rubus and Trifolium. Augochloropsis sumptuosa has been associated with Asclepias, Berlandiera, Bidens, Clethra, Crataegus, Eriogonum, Eryngium, Helianthus, Melilotus, Silphium, Stachys and Vaccinium.

Augochloropsis metallica and its relatives have the largest recorded floral associations of the North American temperate species, with 90 floral records combined for A. metallica, A. fulgida, and the other three species in the group (cuprea, fulvofimbriata, and viridula).

== Antagonistic interactions ==
=== Brood parasitism ===
Brood parasitism by mutillid wasps (Sphinctopsis sp.) have been documented in Augochloropsis iris nests. While guards appear to deter invasion by mutillid wasps, they are not completely effective at preventing parasitism by these wasps.

Members of the fly family Phoridae have been documented parasitizing Augochloropsis iris as well. However, members of Phoridae have only been documented parasitizing the nests of solitary females, indicating that the presence of guards at the entrances of multi-female nests are effective at preventing parasitism.

=== Endoparasites ===
Strepsipterans have been documented parasitizing Augochloropsis iris.

=== Nest Invasion ===
Ants have been documented invading and removing cell contents from the nests of Augochloropsis iris.

== See also ==
- List of Augochloropsis species
