= Procecidocharoides =

Scientific classification
- Kingdom: Animalia
- Phylum: Arthropoda
- Class: Insecta
- Order: Diptera
- Family: Tephritidae
- Subfamily: Tephritinae
- Tribe: Cecidocharini
- Genus: Procecidocharoides; Foote, 1960

Type species
- Trypeta penelope Osten Sacken, 1877

Genus of flies

Procecidocharoides is a genus of tephritid or fruit flies in the family Tephritidae.

== Species ==
These three species belong to the genus Procecidocharoides:

- Procecidocharoides flavissima Foote, 1960
- Procecidocharoides penelope (Osten Sacken, 1877)
- Procecidocharoides pullata Foote, 1960
