= Hetschkomyia =

Scientific classification
- Kingdom: Animalia
- Phylum: Arthropoda
- Class: Insecta
- Order: Diptera
- Family: Tephritidae
- Subfamily: Tephritinae
- Tribe: Cecidocharini
- Genus: Hetschkomyia; Hendel, 1914

Type species
- Hetschkomyia maculipennis Hendel, 1914

Synonyms
- Brachytes Hendel, 1914

Genus of flies

Hetschkomyia is a genus of tephritid or fruit flies in the family Tephritidae.

== Species ==
- Hetschkomyia maculipennis Hendel, 1914
