= Augochloropsis cuprea =

Scientific classification
- Kingdom: Animalia
- Phylum: Arthropoda
- Class: Insecta
- Order: Hymenoptera
- Family: Halictidae
- Genus: Augochloropsis
- Species: A. cuprea

Binomial name
- Augochloropsis cuprea (Smith, 1853)

Species of bee

Augochloropsis cuprea is a brilliant green species of sweat bee in the family Halictidae.

== Range ==
Its range only includes North America.

== Taxonomy ==
In 2022, researchers from the University of Minnesota conducted a taxonomy study, which concluded in Augochloropsis metallica being split into five distinct taxa, A. metallica, Augochloropsis cuprea, Augochloropsis fulgida, Augochloropsis fulvofimbriata, and A. viridula.
