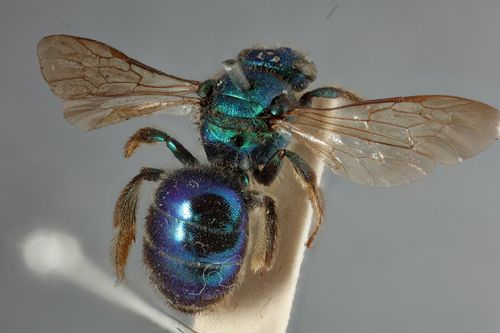
- Female A. fulgida specimen
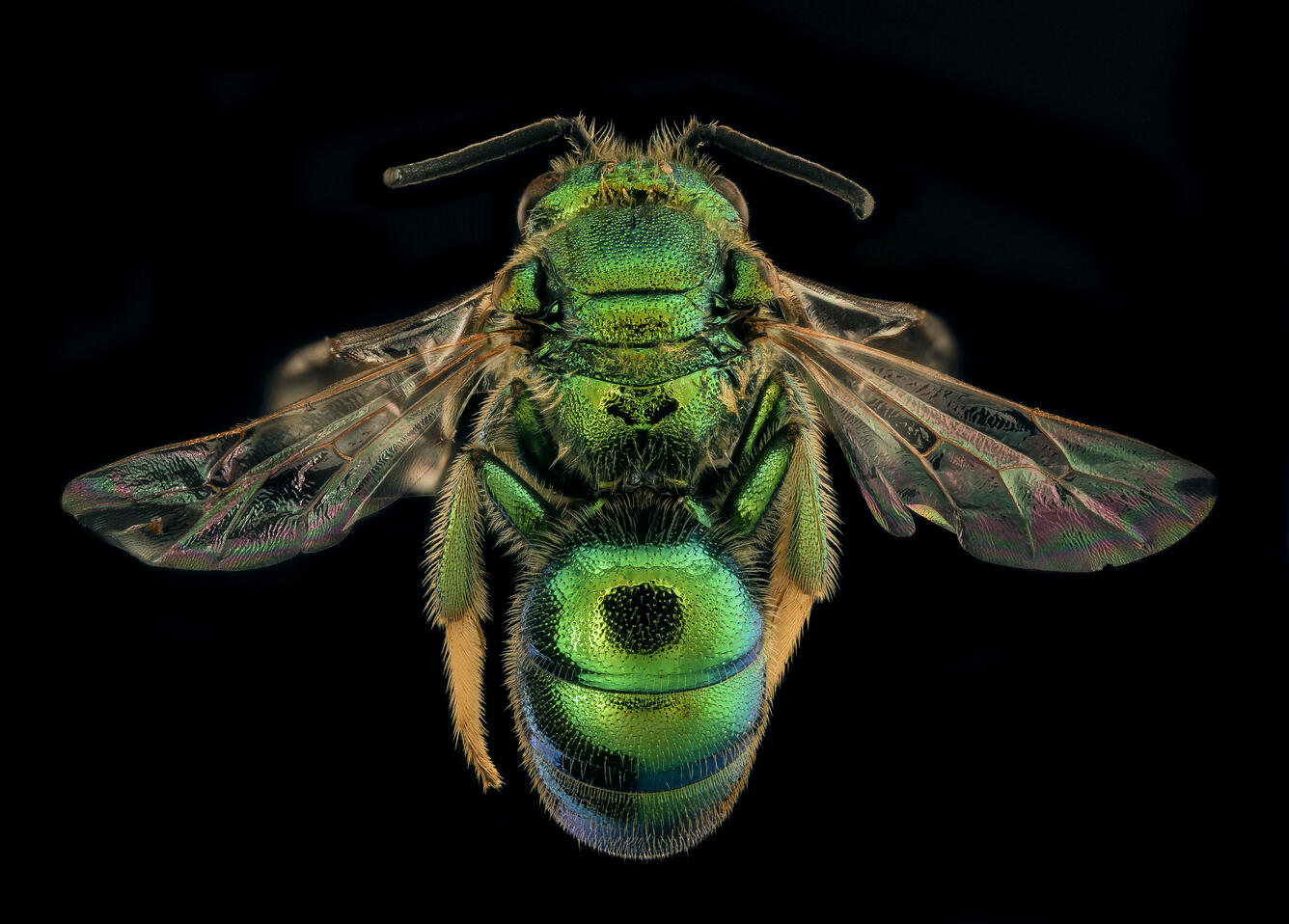
- Male A. fulgida

Scientific classification
- Kingdom: Animalia
- Phylum: Arthropoda
- Clade: Pancrustacea
- Class: Insecta
- Order: Hymenoptera
- Family: Halictidae
- Genus: Augochloropsis
- Species: A. fulgida

Binomial name
- Augochloropsis fulgida (Smith, 1853)

= Augochloropsis fulgida =

Sweat bee

Augochloropsis fulgida is a brilliant green species of sweat bee in the family Halictidae.

== Range ==
Their range extends from Oklahoma, Kansas and Nebraska down to Florida.

== Taxonomy ==
In 2022, researchers from the University of Minnesota conducted a taxonomy study, which concluded in Augochloropsis metallica being split into five distinct taxa, A. metallica, Augochloropsis cuprea, Augochloropsis fulgida, Augochloropsis fulvofimbriata, and A. viridula. A. fulgida had been historically considered a synonym of Augochloropsis metallica, however the researchers concluded it was a separate species.
