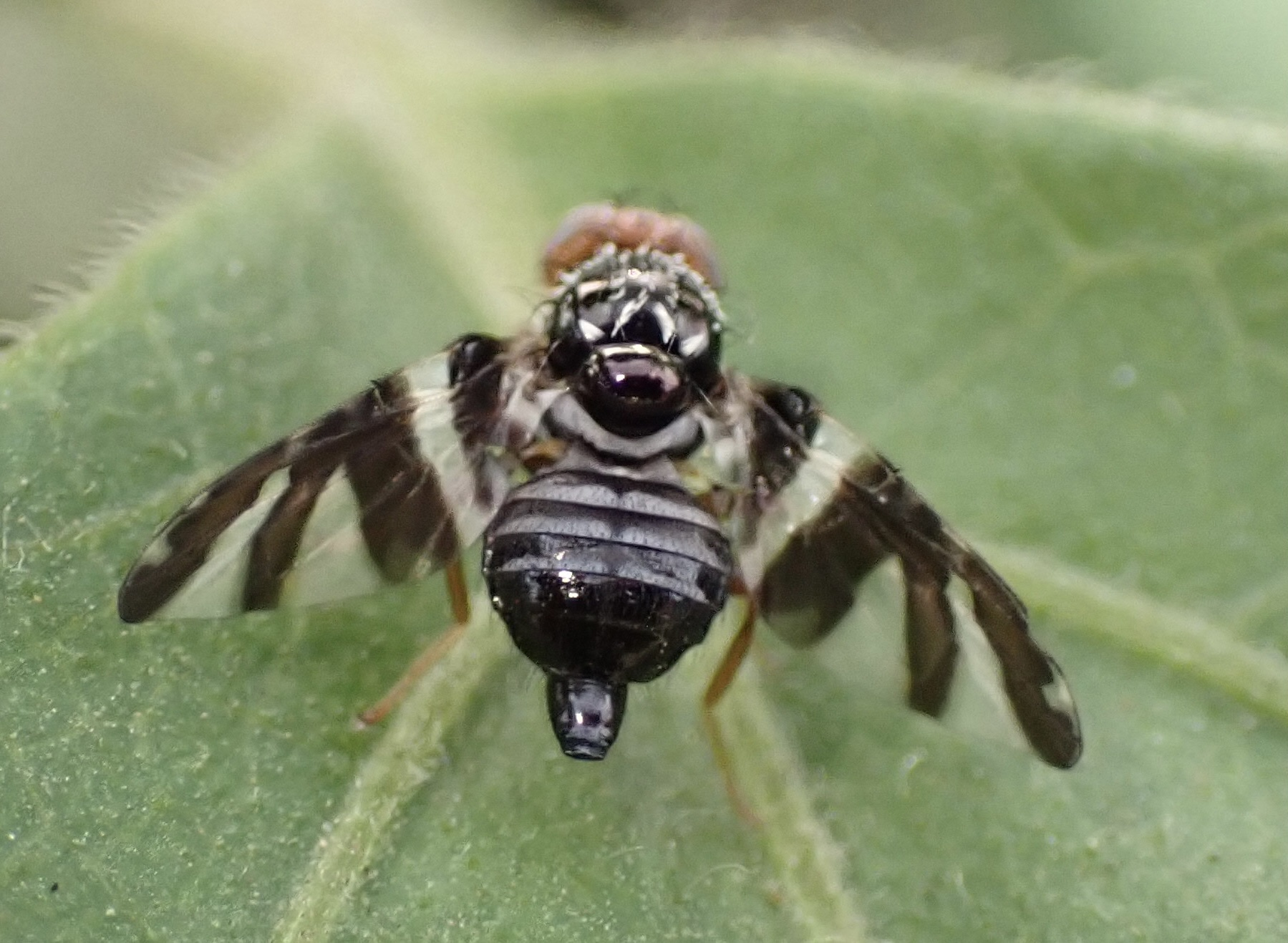
- Cecidochares connexa

Scientific classification
- Kingdom: Animalia
- Phylum: Arthropoda
- Clade: Pancrustacea
- Class: Insecta
- Order: Diptera
- Family: Tephritidae
- Subfamily: Tephritinae
- Tribe: Cecidocharini
- Genus: Cecidochares; Bezzi, 1910

Type species
- Trypeta nigerrima Loew, 1862

Synonyms
- Costalimaia Hering, 1947; Eucecidochares Bezzi & Tavares, 1916

= Cecidochares =

Genus of flies

Cecidochares is a genus of tephritid or fruit flies in the family Tephritidae.

== Species ==
- Cecidochares braziliensis Aczél, 1953
- Cecidochares caliginosa (Foote, 1960)
- Cecidochares connexa (Macquart, 1848)
- Cecidochares delta (Hendel, 1914)
- Cecidochares eupatorii (Kieffer & Jörgensen, 1910)
- Cecidochares fluminensis (Lima, 1934)
- Cecidochares frauenfeldi (Schiner, 1868)
- Cecidochares ianthina Aczél, 1953
- Cecidochares latigenis Hendel, 1914
- Cecidochares rufescens Bezzi, 1913
- Cecidochares violacea Aczél, 1953
