= Neorhagoletis =

Scientific classification
- Kingdom: Animalia
- Phylum: Arthropoda
- Class: Insecta
- Order: Diptera
- Family: Tephritidae
- Subfamily: Tephritinae
- Tribe: Cecidocharini
- Genus: Neorhagoletis; Hendel, 1914

Type species
- Neorhagoletis latifrons Hendel, 1914

Genus of flies

Neorhagoletis is a genus of tephritid or fruit flies in the family Tephritidae.

== Species ==
- Neorhagoletis latifrons Hendel, 1914
