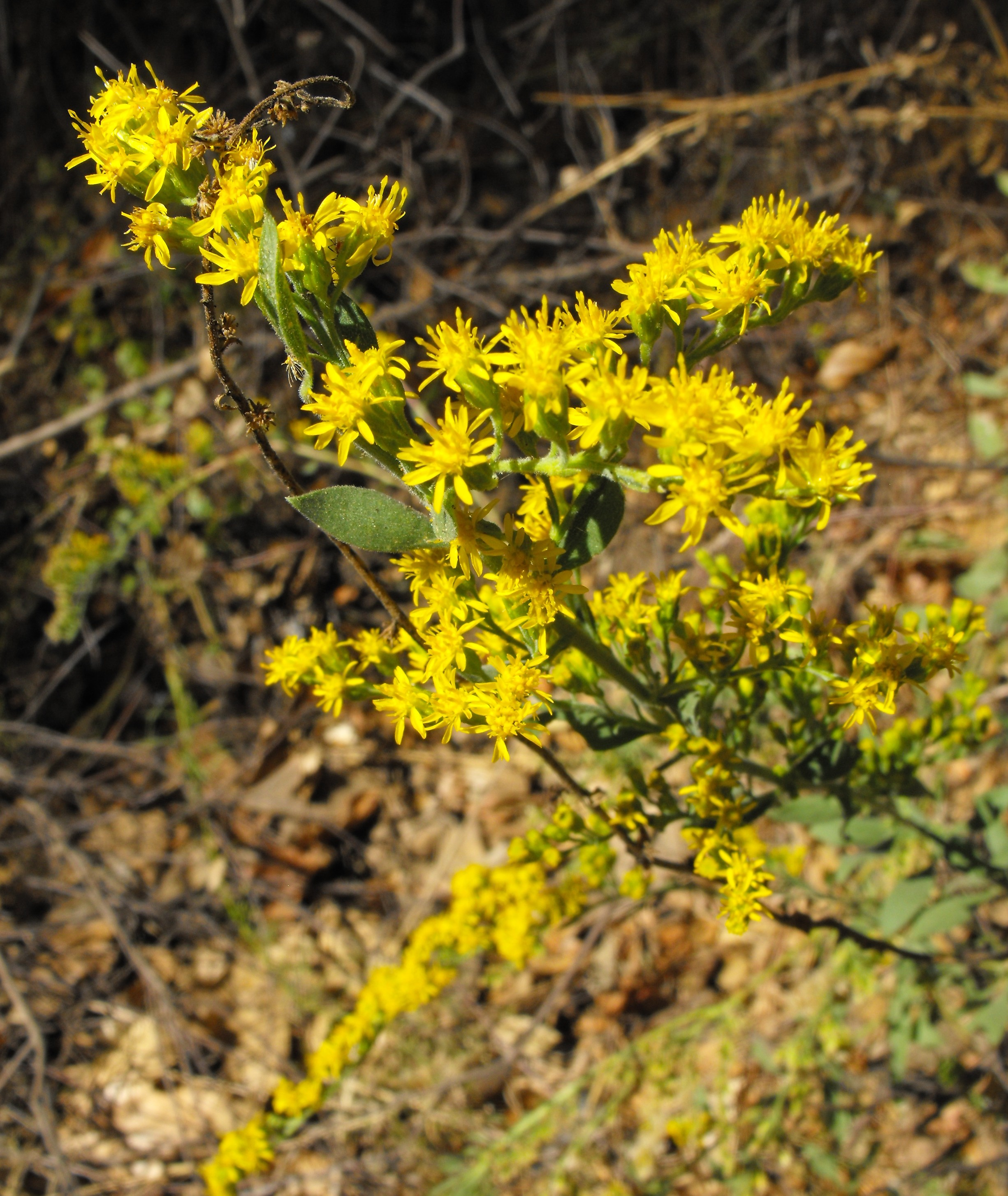

Scientific classification
- Kingdom: Plantae
- Clade: Tracheophytes
- Clade: Angiosperms
- Clade: Eudicots
- Clade: Asterids
- Order: Asterales
- Family: Asteraceae
- Genus: Solidago
- Species: S. californica

Binomial name
- Solidago californica Nutt. 1840

Synonyms
- Aster californicus (Nutt.) Kuntze 1891 not Less. 1831; Solidago velutina subsp. californica (Nutt.) Semple

= Solidago californica =

Species of flowering plant

Solidago californica is a species of goldenrod known by the common name California goldenrod.

It is native to western North America from Oregon through California to Baja California. It grows in many types of habitats, including oak woodlands, valley grassland, chaparral, and sometimes disturbed areas.

== Description ==
Solidago californica is a rhizomatous perennial herb producing a hairy stem up to 1.5 metres (5 ft) tall. The lance-shaped leaves are up to 14 cm (5 1/2 in) long near the plant's base and smaller higher up.

The inflorescence is a narrow, often one-sided series or cluster of many flower heads. Each flower head contains many yellow disc florets and surrounded by up to 11 narrow yellow ray florets which measure up to 5 mm (1/4 in) long.

== Galls ==
This species is host to the following insect induced galls:

- Asteromyia carbonifera (Osten Sacken, 1862)
- Procecidochares anthracina (Doane, 1899)

external link to gallformers
