= Ostracocoelia =

Scientific classification
- Kingdom: Animalia
- Phylum: Arthropoda
- Class: Insecta
- Order: Diptera
- Family: Tephritidae
- Subfamily: Tephritinae
- Tribe: Cecidocharini
- Genus: Ostracocoelia; Giglio-Tos, 1893

Type species
- Ostracocoelia mirabilis Giglio-Tos, 1893

Synonyms
- Ceratitoedaspis Aczél, 1953

Genus of flies

Ostracocoelia is a genus of tephritid or fruit flies in the family Tephritidae.

== Species ==
- Ostracocoelia mirabilis Giglio-Tos, 1893
