= Cecidocharella =

Scientific classification
- Kingdom: Animalia
- Phylum: Arthropoda
- Class: Insecta
- Order: Diptera
- Family: Tephritidae
- Subfamily: Tephritinae
- Tribe: Cecidocharini
- Genus: Cecidocharella; Hendel, 1936

Type species
- Cecidocharella elegans Hendel, 1936

Genus of flies

Cecidocharella is a genus of tephritid or fruit flies in the family Tephritidae.

== Species ==
- Cecidocharella elegans Hendel, 1936
