= Procecidochares polita =

Scientific classification
- Kingdom: Animalia
- Phylum: Arthropoda
- Clade: Pancrustacea
- Class: Insecta
- Order: Diptera
- Family: Tephritidae
- Subfamily: Tephritinae
- Tribe: Cecidocharini
- Genus: Procecidochares
- Species: P. polita

Binomial name
- Procecidochares polita Loew, 1862

Synonyms
- Trypeta polita Loew, 1862

Species of fly

Procecidochares polita is a species of tephritid or fruit flies in the genus Procecidochares of the family Tephritidae.

== Distribution ==
United States.
