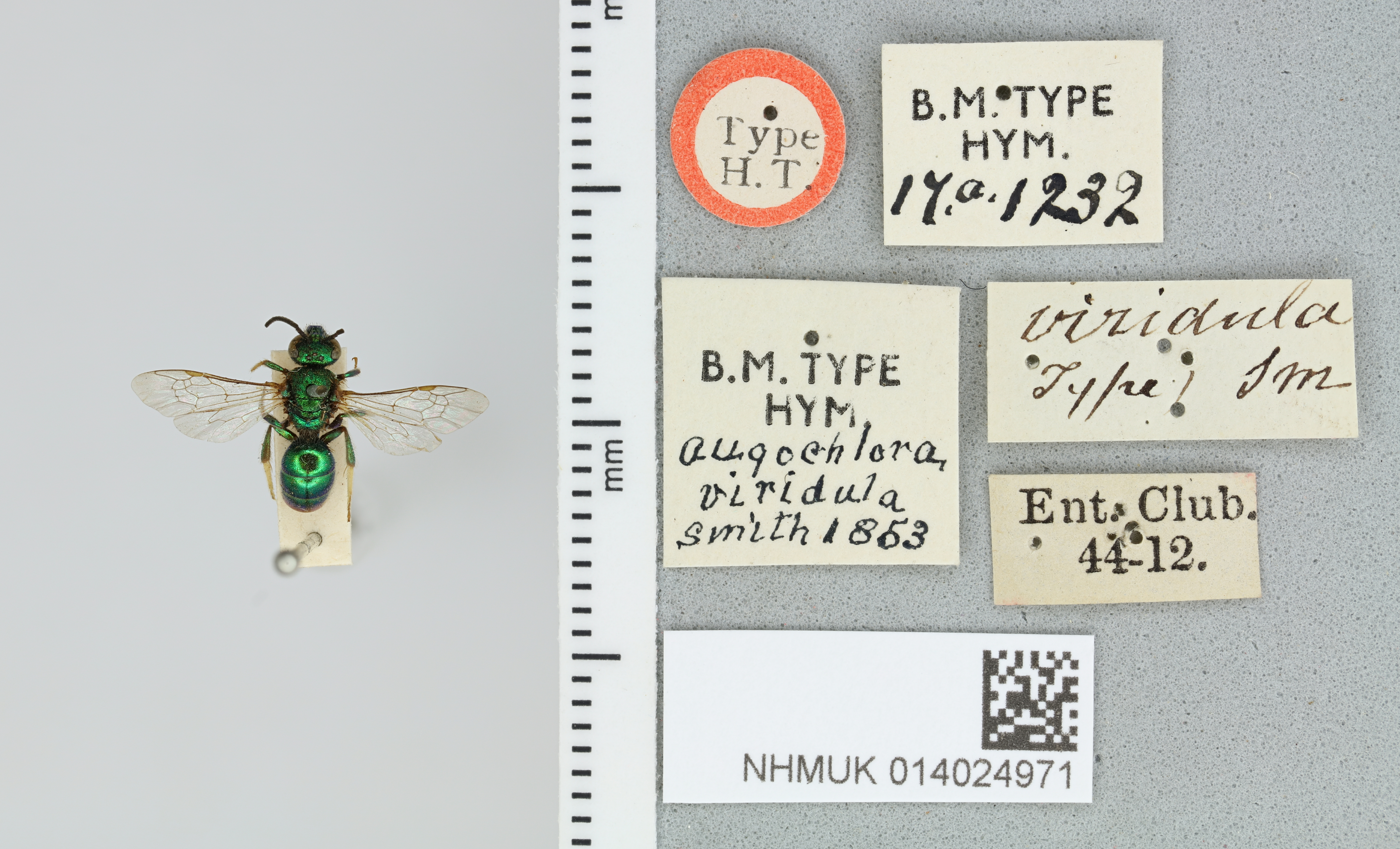
- A dry specimen with its wings splayed out

Conservation status
- Unranked (NatureServe)

Scientific classification
- Kingdom: Animalia
- Phylum: Arthropoda
- Class: Insecta
- Order: Hymenoptera
- Family: Halictidae
- Genus: Augochloropsis
- Species: A. viridula

Binomial name
- Augochloropsis viridula (Smith, 1853)

= Augochloropsis viridula =

Species of bee

Augochloropsis viridula, the northeastern sweat bee, is a brilliant green species of sweat bee in the family Halictidae.

== Description ==
The fringe hairs of the northeastern sweat bee is about the same length as the metasomal hairs. Two to four puncture widths separate the terga.

== Range ==
It can be primarily found in the Midwestern United States as well as Canada where it coincides with the similar-looking Metallic epauletted-sweat bee. Though, it is not found as far out as in Oklahoma, Kansas and Nebraska.

== Taxonomy ==
The species was first described by British entomologist, Frederick Smith in 1853.

In 2022, researchers from the University of Minnesota conducted a taxonomy study, which concluded in Augochloropsis metallica being split into five distinct taxa, A. metallica, Augochloropsis cuprea, Augochloropsis fulgida, Augochloropsis fulvofimbriata, and A. viridula. A. viridula had been historically referred to as Augochloropsis metallica fulgida, however the researchers concluded it was a separate species and resurrected its original description, A. viridula.
