= Pyrgotoides =

Scientific classification
- Kingdom: Animalia
- Phylum: Arthropoda
- Class: Insecta
- Order: Diptera
- Family: Tephritidae
- Subfamily: Tephritinae
- Tribe: Cecidocharini
- Genus: Pyrgotoides; Curran, 1934

Type species
- Pyrgotoides crassipes Curran, 1934

Synonyms
- Gerrhoceras Hering, 1942

Genus of flies

Pyrgotoides is a genus of tephritid or fruit flies in the family Tephritidae.

== Species ==
- Pyrgotoides crassipes Curran, 289
- Pyrgotoides paradoxus (Hering, 1942)
- Pyrgotoides peruviana (Korytkowski, 1976)
