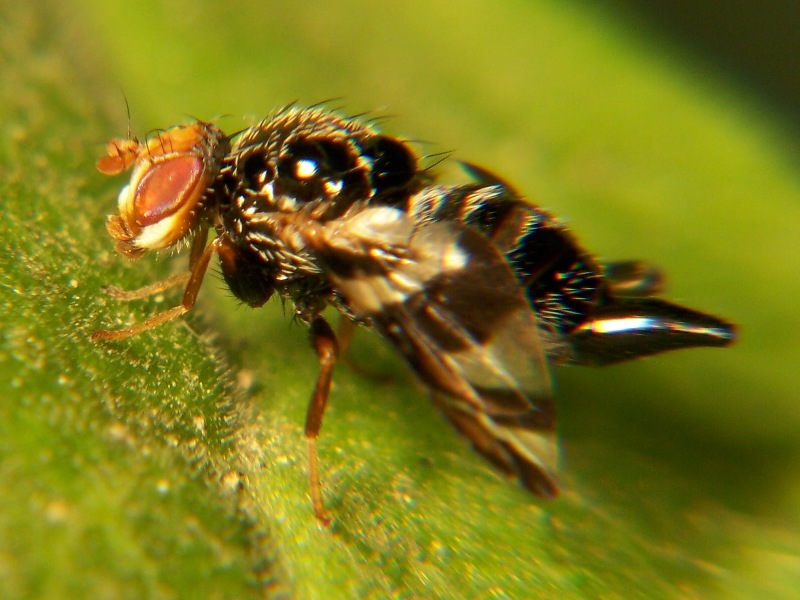
- Procecidochares atra

Scientific classification
- Kingdom: Animalia
- Phylum: Arthropoda
- Clade: Pancrustacea
- Class: Insecta
- Order: Diptera
- Family: Tephritidae
- Subfamily: Tephritinae
- Tribe: Cecidocharini
- Genus: Procecidochares
- Species: P. atra

Binomial name
- Procecidochares atra Loew, 1862

Synonyms
- Trypeta atra Loew, 1862; Oedaspis setigera Coquillett, 1899

= Procecidochares atra =

Species of fly

Procecidochares atra is a species of tephritid or fruit flies in the genus Procecidochares of the family Tephritidae.

Its galls are most common on Solidago altissima, S. gigantea, S. rugosa.

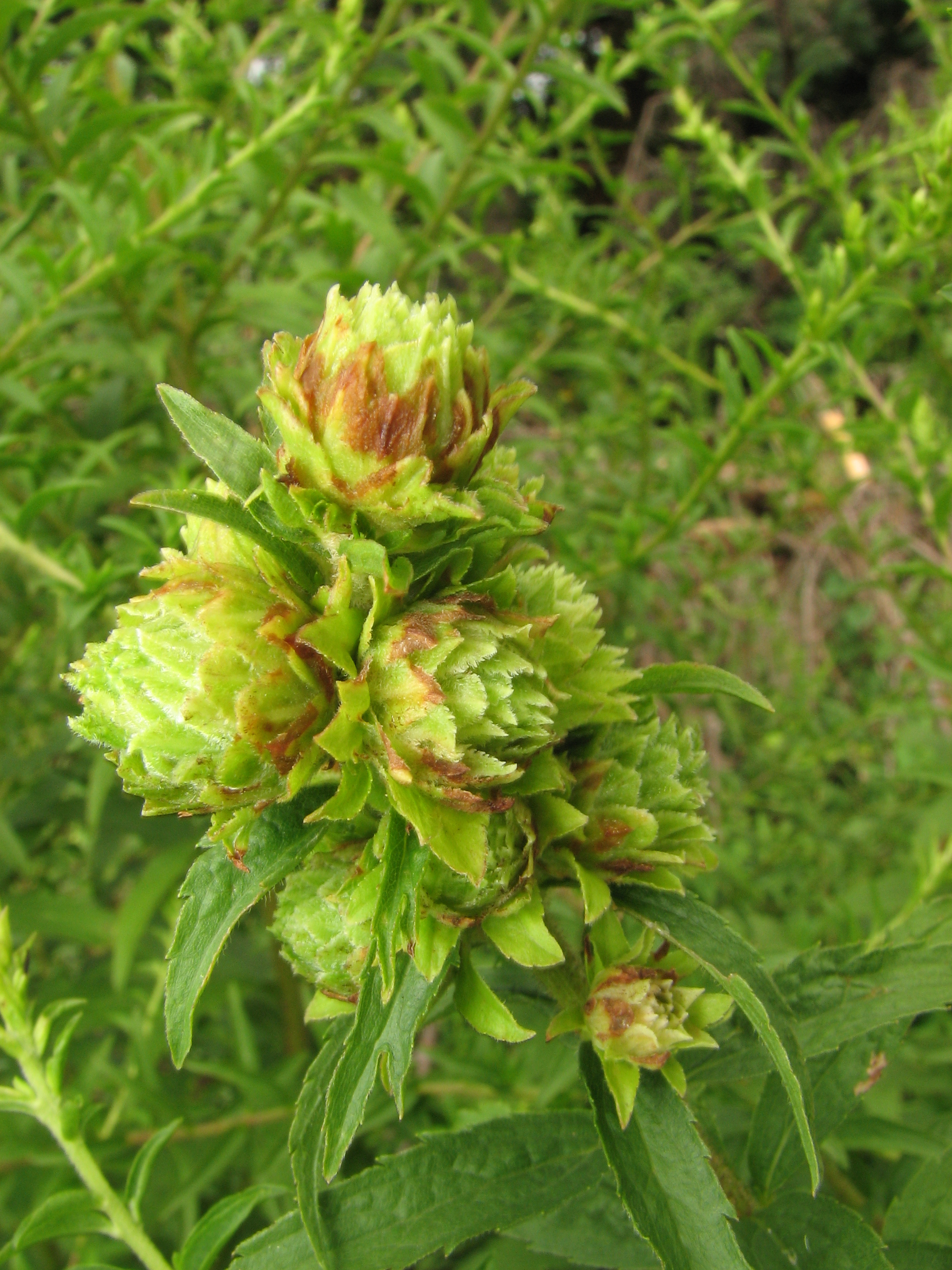
Galls made by P. atra

== Distribution ==
Canada, United States, Mexico.
