= Francis H. Snow =

American professor and chancellor

Francis Huntington Snow
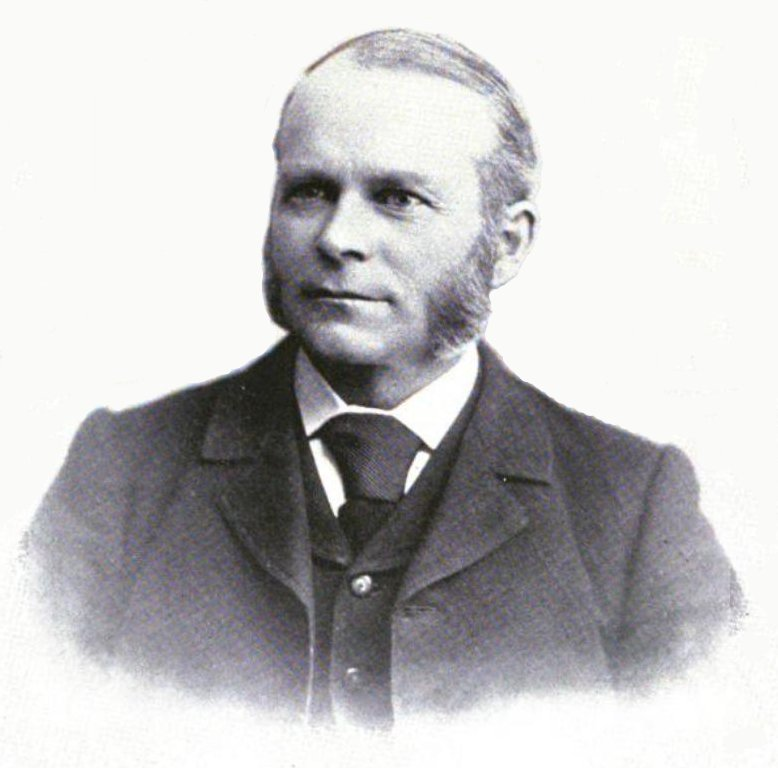
- Born: June 29, 1840; Fitchburg, Massachusetts
- Died: September 21, 1908 (aged 68); Delafield, Wisconsin
- Education: Williams College, B.A. (1863), M.A. (1866), Ph.D. (1881); Andover Theological Seminary, (1866); Princeton University, LL.D. (1890)

5th Chancellor of the University of Kansas
- In office 1890–1901
- Preceded by: Joshua Lippincott
- Succeeded by: Frank Strong

Francis Huntington Snow (June 29, 1840 – September 21, 1908) was an American naturalist and educator. He spent more than forty years at the University of Kansas, first as a professor of natural history and then as chancellor. He was interested in several fields of science including botany, ornithology and geology but his primary focus was entomology. He was well-known as a field naturalist, based on 26 years of field collecting trips that he organized and led throughout Kansas, Arizona, Colorado, New Mexico and Texas. During these excursions, he and his students collected a quarter-million insect specimens representing some 21,000 species.

Born on June 29, 1840, in Fitchburg, Massachusetts, Snow was the son of Benjamin and Mary B. (Boutelle) Snow. One of his paternal ancestors, Richard Warren, was a member of the Mayflower company. He was married on June 8, 1868, to Jane Appleton Aiken.

Snow attended Fitchburg High School in preparation for Williams College, where he graduated in 1862, standing first in his class. After teaching one year as principal of the Fitchburg high school he entered the Andover Theological Seminary, completing its course of study in 1866. This same year he received his master's degree from Williams. He would later receive a Ph.D. from Williams in 1881, and the degree of LL.D. from Princeton University in 1890. He was a member of the college fraternity Delta Upsilon, and of the honorary societies Sigma Xi and Phi Beta Kappa at KU.

After leaving Andover Seminary he preached for a while, although not regularly installed as pastor. "He served two seasons with the Christian commission at the front of the Union army, being present at Lee's surrender." In 1866 he was elected to the first faculty of the University of Kansas as professor of mathematics and natural sciences. During the first year he spent in Lawrence, Kansas, he preached almost every Sunday in nearby pulpits.

In 1870 Snow became professor of natural history, and during the next decade he organized the collecting expeditions which resulted in the natural history museum at the university. Snow was the curator of all the natural history collections until 1891, when he hired his former student, Lewis Lindsay Dyche, to curate the zoological collections; the entomological and botanical collections were curated by Snow. Despite an early affinity for botany, Snow's primary research was in entomology. This is because shortly after Snow came to Kansas, James A. Carruth was appointed as state botanist, and he decided not to duplicate Carruth's work. The R.L. McGregor Herbarium at KU houses over 500 of Snow's botanical specimens, but many of his early specimens were sent to Carruth's herbarium and eventually lost. In the entomological collection there are more than 200 species of insects discovered by him.

In 1882 Snow was appointed entomologist to the Kansas State Board of Agriculture. He experimented with an early application of biological insect control, infecting chinch bugs in the laboratory with a fatal fungus and then distributing the infected insects throughout the state. The attempt was partially successful, only working well when the weather conditions were favorable.

Snow started the first scientific publication of the university, The Observer of Nature, and for some years he was editor of the scientific journal Psyche. He made frequent contributions to the university bulletins and reports and to the Kansas Academy of Science, of which he was a founder and president. Throughout his connection with the university he made and published systematic meteorological reports.

In 1886 the legislature appropriated $50,000 for the erection of a new building designed by John G. Haskell which was named Snow Hall of Natural History in his honor. Seriously deteriorated by 1915, the original limestone building was demolished in 1934, and salvaged stone was used on the university's Military Science Building. The new Snow Hall was opened in 1930. In 1890 the university received a bequest from his uncle, William B. Spooner, with which Spooner library and the chancellor's residence were erected. Snow was the fifth chancellor of the university from 1890 until 1901.

Snow died at Delafield, Wisconsin, on September 21, 1908. He was survived by his wife and four of his five children.
