= Augochloropsis fulvofimbriata =

Scientific classification
- Kingdom: Animalia
- Phylum: Arthropoda
- Class: Insecta
- Order: Hymenoptera
- Family: Halictidae
- Genus: Augochloropsis
- Species: A. fulvofimbriata

Binomial name
- Augochloropsis fulvofimbriata (Friese, 1917)

Species of sweat bee

Augochloropsis fulvofimbriata is a brilliant green species of sweat bee in the family Halictidae.

== Range ==
It is found throughout Central and South America.

== Taxonomy ==
In 2022, researchers from the University of Minnesota conducted a taxonomy study, which concluded in Augochloropsis metallica being split into five distinct taxa, A. metallica, Augochloropsis cuprea, Augochloropsis fulgida, Augochloropsis fulvofimbriata, and A. viridula. A. fulvofimbriata had been historically considered a synonym of Augochloropsis metallica, however the researchers concluded it was a separate species.
