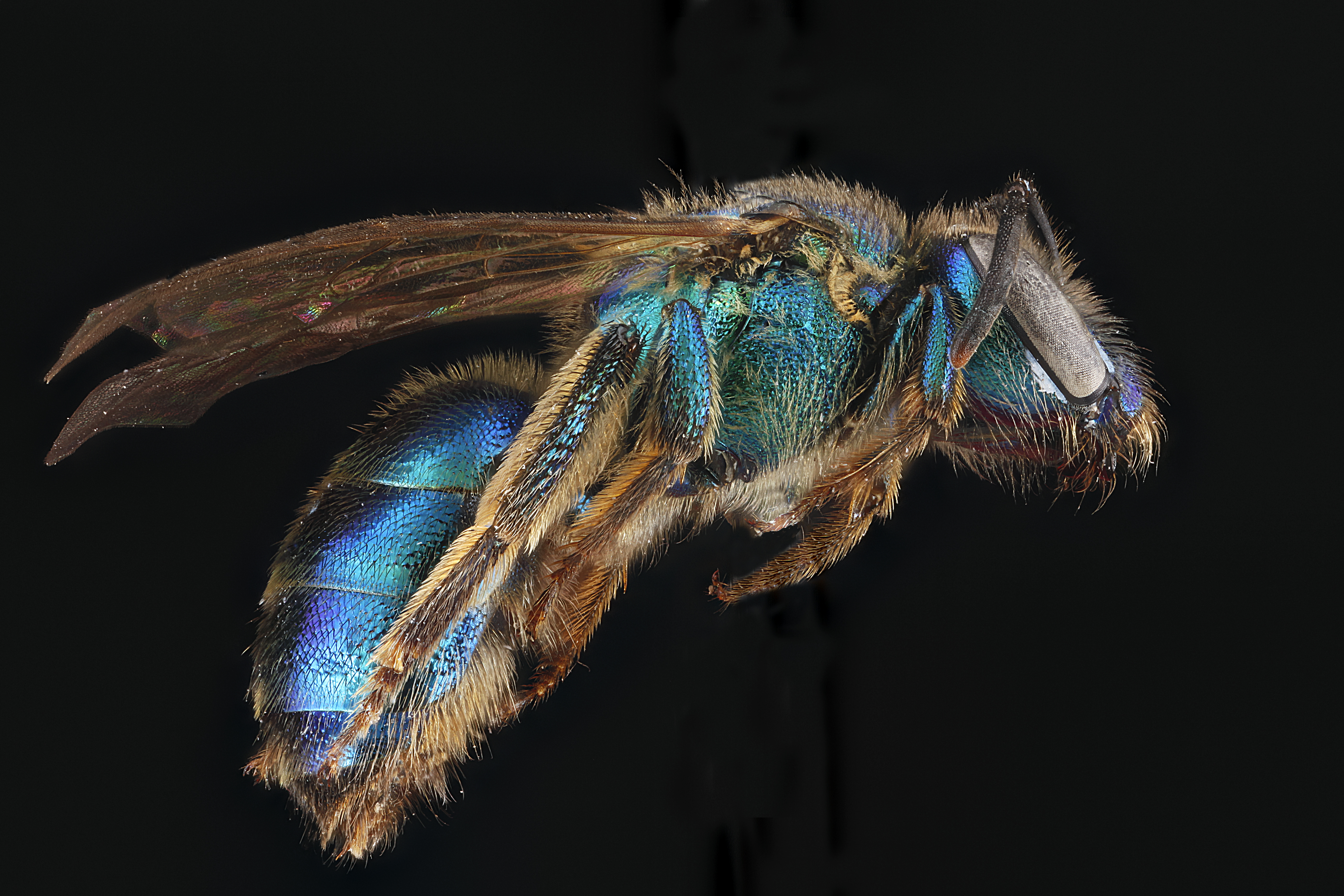

Scientific classification
- Kingdom: Animalia
- Phylum: Arthropoda
- Class: Insecta
- Order: Hymenoptera
- Family: Halictidae
- Tribe: Augochlorini
- Genus: Augochloropsis
- Species: A. anonyma

Binomial name
- Augochloropsis anonyma (Cockerell, 1922)

= Augochloropsis anonyma =

Species of bee

Augochloropsis anonyma is a species of sweat bee in the family Halictidae.
