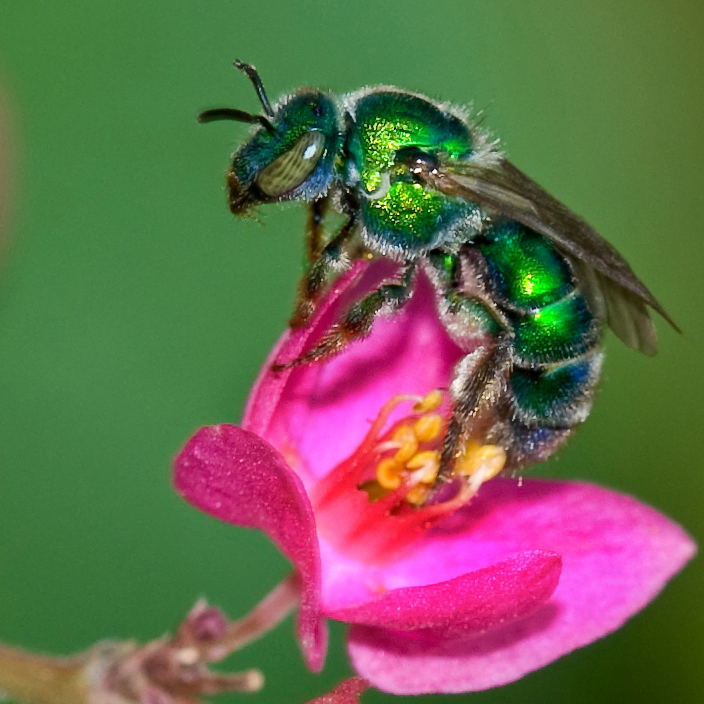

Scientific classification
- Kingdom: Animalia
- Phylum: Arthropoda
- Class: Insecta
- Order: Hymenoptera
- Family: Halictidae
- Genus: Augochloropsis
- Species: A. metallica

Binomial name
- Augochloropsis metallica (Fabricius, 1793)

= Augochloropsis metallica =

Species of bee

Augochloropsis metallica or Metallic epauletted-sweat bee is a brilliant green species of sweat bee in the family Halictidae. Their native range encompasses Central America and extends into parts of North America, where they are commonly found in regions such as the Midwest, Northeast, and the Southern United States.

A. metallica was first named and classified by Fabricius in 1793. It originally included two subspecies, metallica and fulgida, but a recent taxonomic study elevated fulgida to the status of a separate species (A. fulgida). This revision ultimately resulted in the division of A. metallica into five species (A. metallica, A. cuprea, A. fulgida, A. fulvofimbriata, and A. viridula).
