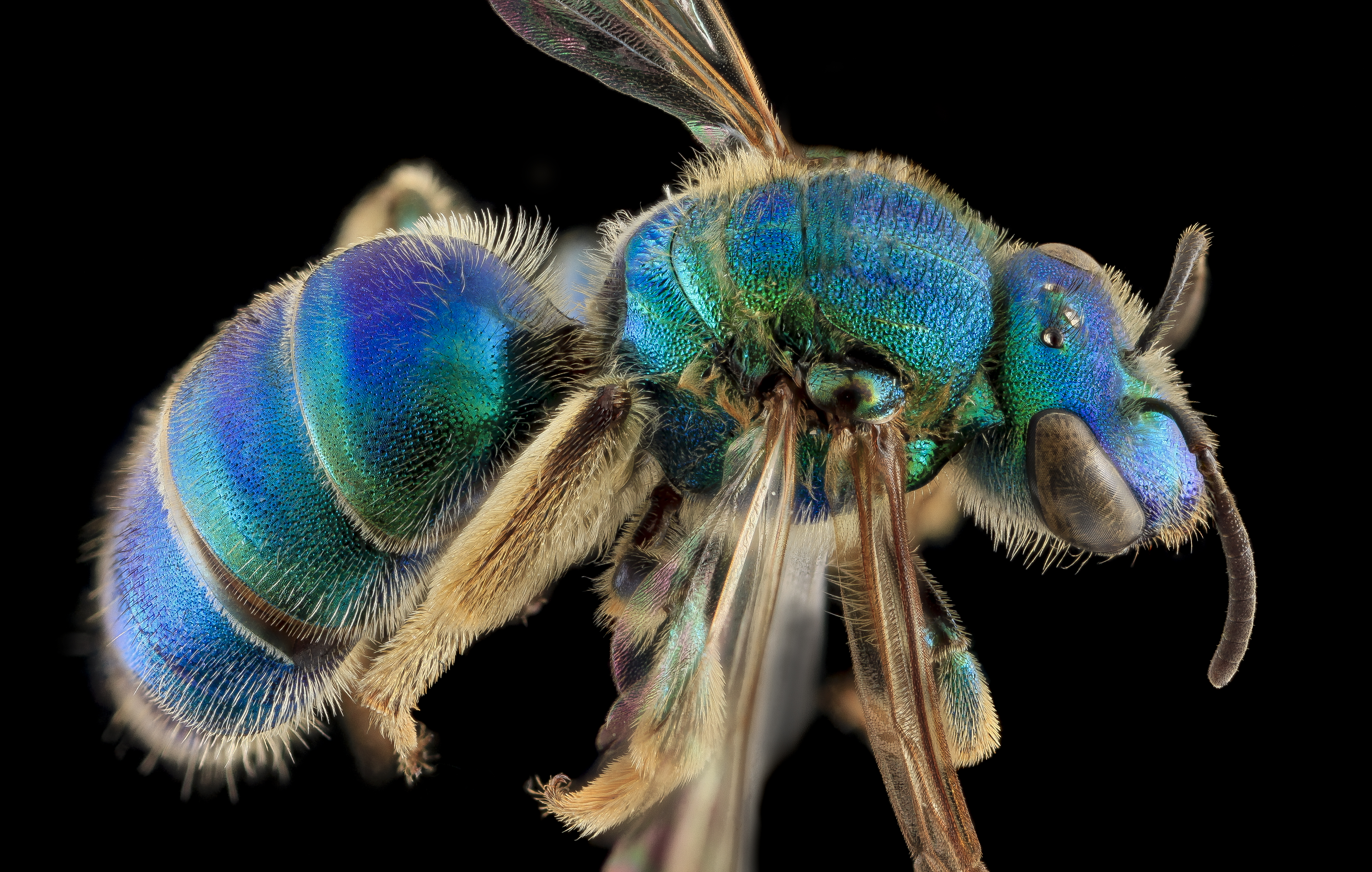

Scientific classification
- Domain: Eukaryota
- Kingdom: Animalia
- Phylum: Arthropoda
- Class: Insecta
- Order: Hymenoptera
- Family: Halictidae
- Tribe: Augochlorini
- Genus: Augochloropsis
- Species: A. sumptuosa

Binomial name
- Augochloropsis sumptuosa (Smith, 1853)

= Augochloropsis sumptuosa =

Species of bee

Augochloropsis sumptuosa is a species of sweat bee in the family Halictidae.
