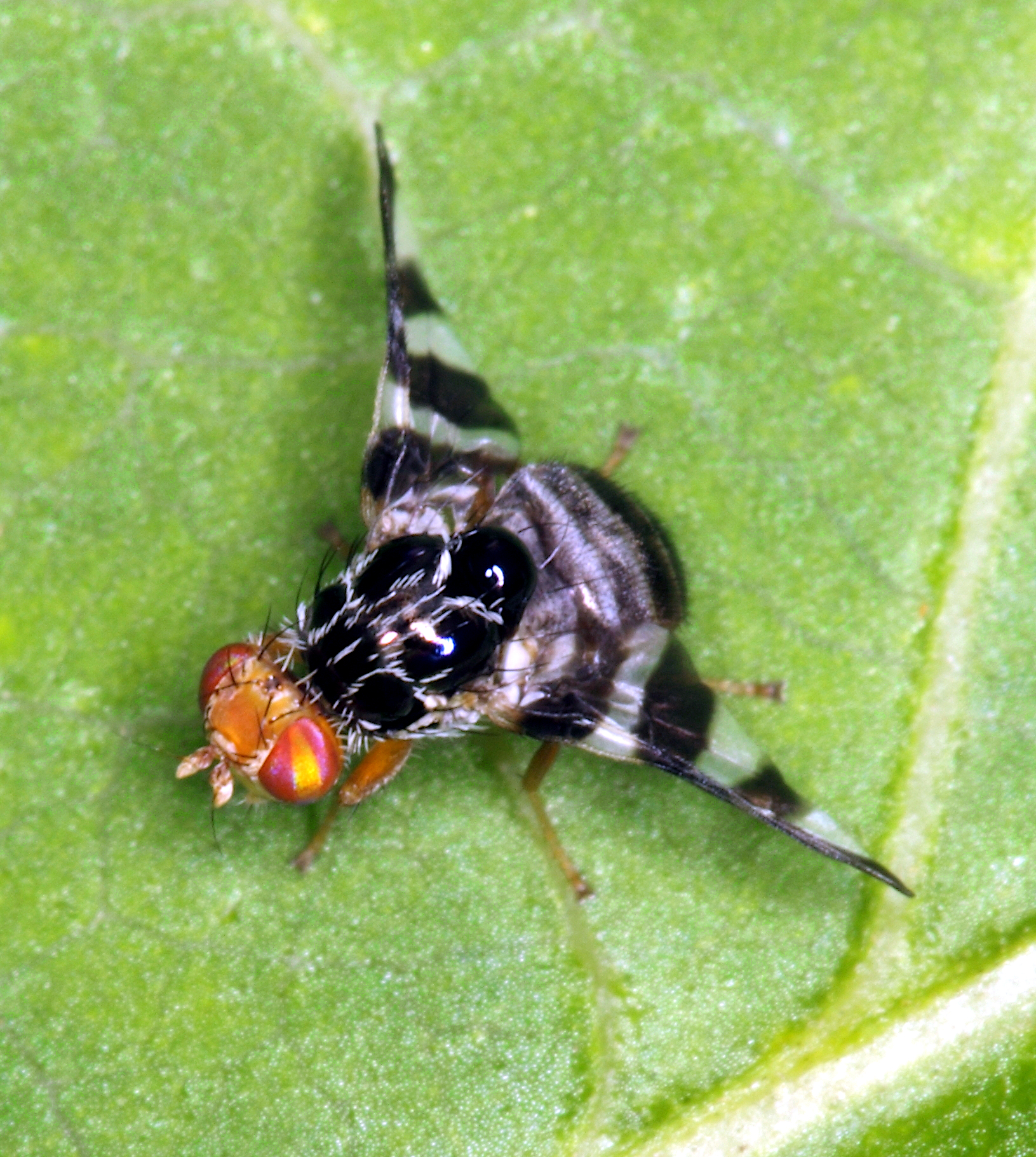
- Procecidochares atra

Scientific classification
- Kingdom: Animalia
- Phylum: Arthropoda
- Class: Insecta
- Order: Diptera
- Superfamily: Tephritoidea
- Family: Tephritidae
- Subfamily: Tephritinae
- Tribe: Cecidocharini

= Cecidocharini =

Tribe of flies

Cecidocharini is a tribe of tephritid or fruit flies in the family Tephritidae.

== Genera ==
- Cecidocharella Hendel, 1936
- Cecidochares Bezzi, 1910
- Hetschkomyia Hendel, 1914
- Neorhagoletis Hendel, 1914
- Ostracocoelia Giglio-Tos, 1893
- Procecidochares Hendel, 1914
- Procecidocharoides Foote, 1960
- Pyrgotoides Curran, 1934
