= List of Mimosa species =

The following species in the flowering plant genus Mimosa are accepted by Plants of the World Online. About 90% of its hundreds of species are found in the Neotropics.

- Mimosa acantholoba (Humb. & Bonpl. ex Willd.) Poir.
- Mimosa acapulcensis B.L.Rob.
- Mimosa accedens Barneby
- Mimosa acroconica Barneby
- Mimosa aculeaticarpa Ortega
- Mimosa acutistipula (Mart.) Benth.
- Mimosa adamantina Barneby
- Mimosa adenantheroides (M.Martens & Galeotti) Benth.
- Mimosa adenocarpa Benth.
- Mimosa adenotricha Benth.
- Mimosa adpressa Hook. & Arn.
- Mimosa affinis B.L.Rob.
- Mimosa aguapeia Barneby
- Mimosa albida Humb. & Bonpl. ex Willd.
- Mimosa albolanata Taub.
- Mimosa alleniana Morong
- Mimosa altoparanensis Burkart
- Mimosa amambayensis Hassl.
- Mimosa amnis-atri Barneby
- Mimosa andina Benth.
- Mimosa andringitrensis R.Vig.
- Mimosa annularis Spruce ex Benth.
- Mimosa antioquensis Killip ex Rudd
- Mimosa antrorsa Benth.
- Mimosa apodocarpa Benth.
- Mimosa arenosa (Willd.) Poir.
- Mimosa arturoana M.Morales & Fortunato
- Mimosa aspera M.E.Jones
- Mimosa asperoides Izag. & Beyhaut
- Mimosa atlantica Barneby
- Mimosa aureliana Barneby & Fortunato
- Mimosa auriberbis Barneby
- Mimosa auriculata Benth.
- Mimosa aurivillus Mart.
- Mimosa australis Izag. & Beyhaut
- Mimosa axillarioides Izag. & Beyhaut
- Mimosa axillaris Benth.
- Mimosa bahamensis Benth.
- Mimosa balansae Micheli
- Mimosa balduinii Burkart
- Mimosa baptistae Schmidt Silveira & Miotto
- Mimosa barberi Gamble
- Mimosa barnebiana Fortunato & Tressens
- Mimosa barrancana Gentry
- Mimosa barretoi Hoehne
- Mimosa bathyrrhena Barneby
- Mimosa benthamii J.F.Macbr.
- Mimosa berroi Burkart
- Mimosa bifurca Benth.
- Mimosa bimucronata (DC.) Kuntze
- Mimosa bipennatula Barneby
- Mimosa bispiculata Barneby
- Mimosa biuncifera Benth.
- Mimosa blanchetii Benth.
- Mimosa bocainae Barneby
- Mimosa boliviana Benth.
- Mimosa bombycina Barneby
- Mimosa bonplandii Benth.
- Mimosa borboremae Harms
- Mimosa borealis A.Gray
- Mimosa brachycarpa Benth.
- Mimosa brachycarpoides Barneby
- Mimosa brachystachya Taub.
- Mimosa bracteolaris Benth.
- Mimosa brevipes Benth.
- Mimosa brevipetiolata Burkart
- Mimosa brevipinna Benth.
- Mimosa brevispicata Britton
- Mimosa burchellii Benth.
- Mimosa burkartii Marchesi
- Mimosa busseana Harms
- Mimosa caaguazuensis Barneby
- Mimosa caccavariana Santos-Silva & A.M.G.Azevedo
- Mimosa caduca (Humb. & Bonpl. ex Willd.) Poir.
- Mimosa caerulea Rose
- Mimosa caesalpiniifolia Benth.
- Mimosa cainguensis Burkart
- Mimosa calcicola B.L.Rob.
- Mimosa caliciadenia Barneby
- Mimosa calliandroides Hoehne
- Mimosa callidryas Barneby
- Mimosa callithrix Malme
- Mimosa calocephala Mart.
- Mimosa calodendron Mart. ex Benth.
- Mimosa campicola Harms
- Mimosa camporum Benth.
- Mimosa canahuensis Standl. & Steyerm.
- Mimosa canastrensis V.F.Dutra & F.C.P.Garcia
- Mimosa candelabrum Hassl.
- Mimosa candollei R.Grether
- Mimosa capito Barneby
- Mimosa capuronii Villiers
- Mimosa carolina M.Morales & Marc.F.Simon
- Mimosa carvalhoi Barneby
- Mimosa casta L.
- Mimosa castanoclada Barneby & Fortunato
- Mimosa catharinensis Burkart
- Mimosa centurionis Barneby
- Mimosa ceratonia L.
- Mimosa cerifera Schmidt Silveira & Miotto
- Mimosa chacoensis Barneby & Fortunato
- Mimosa chaetosphaera Barneby
- Mimosa chartostegia Barneby
- Mimosa chelata Izag. & Beyhaut
- Mimosa chiliomera Barneby
- Mimosa chiquitaniensis Atahuachi & C.E.Hughes
- Mimosa chochisensis Atahuachi & C.E.Hughes
- Mimosa chodatii Hassl.
- Mimosa chrysastra Mart. ex Benth.
- Mimosa chrysothrix V.F.Dutra & F.C.P.Garcia
- Mimosa cisparanensis Barneby
- Mimosa claussenii Benth.
- Mimosa coelocarpa B.L.Rob.
- Mimosa colombiana Britton & Killip
- Mimosa congestifolia Burkart
- Mimosa coniflora Burkart
- Mimosa cordistipula Benth.
- Mimosa cordobensis Ariza
- Mimosa coruscocaesia Barneby
- Mimosa corynadenia Britton & Rose
- Mimosa costenya McVaugh
- Mimosa craspedisetosa Fortunato & Palese
- Mimosa cruenta Benth.
- Mimosa crumenarioides L.P.Queiroz & G.P.Lewis
- Mimosa cryptogloea Barneby
- Mimosa cryptothamnos Barneby
- Mimosa ctenodes Barneby
- Mimosa cubatanensis Hoehne
- Mimosa cuiabensis L.Rico & R.Grether
- Mimosa custodis Barneby
- Mimosa cuzcoana J.F.Macbr.
- Mimosa cyclophylla Taub.
- Mimosa cylindracea Benth.
- Mimosa daleoides Benth.
- Mimosa dalyi Barneby
- Mimosa dasilvae A.S.L.Silva & Secco
- Mimosa dasyphylla Baker
- Mimosa deamii B.L.Rob.
- Mimosa debilis Humb. & Bonpl. ex Willd.
- Mimosa deceptrix Barneby
- Mimosa decorticans Barneby
- Mimosa decumbens V.F.Dutra & F.C.P.Garcia
- Mimosa delicatula Baill. ex Drake
- Mimosa demissa Barneby
- Mimosa densa Benth.
- Mimosa depauperata Benth.
- Mimosa detinens Benth.
- Mimosa dicerastes Barneby
- Mimosa dichroa Barneby
- Mimosa diffusa Benth.
- Mimosa digitata Benth.
- Mimosa diminuta Marc.F.Simon & C.E.Hughes
- Mimosa diplacantha Benth.
- Mimosa diplotricha C.Wright
- Mimosa discobola Barneby
- Mimosa disperma Barneby
- Mimosa distachya Cav.
- Mimosa distans Benth.
- Mimosa diversifolia Micheli
- Mimosa diversipila M.Micheli
- Mimosa dolens Vell.
- Mimosa dominarum Barneby
- Mimosa domingensis (Bertero ex DC.) Benth.
- Mimosa dormiens Humb. & Bonpl. ex Willd.
- Mimosa dryandroides Taub.
- Mimosa dumetaria Villiers
- Mimosa dupuyana M.Morales & Fortunato
- Mimosa dutrae Malme
- Mimosa dysocarpa Benth.
- Mimosa echinocaula Benth.
- Mimosa egregia Sandwith
- Mimosa ekmanii Urb.
- Mimosa elliptica Benth.
- Mimosa emoryana Benth.
- Mimosa ephedroides (Gillies ex Hook.) Benth.
- Mimosa epitropica Barneby & León de la Luz
- Mimosa equisetum Barneby
- Mimosa eriocarpa Benth.
- Mimosa eriorrhachis Barneby
- Mimosa ernestii Harms
- Mimosa ervendbergii A.Gray
- Mimosa eurystegia Barneby ex M.Morales, Ribas & Santos-Silva
- Mimosa exalbescens Barneby
- Mimosa excedentis Izag. & Beyhaut
- Mimosa extensa Benth.
- Mimosa extranea Benth.
- Mimosa fachinalensis Burkart
- Mimosa fagaracantha Griseb.
- Mimosa falcipinna Benth.
- Mimosa falconis Barneby
- Mimosa farinosa Griseb.
- Mimosa fernandez-casasii Barneby & Fortunato
- Mimosa fiebrigii Hassl.
- Mimosa filipes Mart.
- Mimosa filipetiola Burkart
- Mimosa flabellifolia Barneby
- Mimosa flagellaris Benth.
- Mimosa flavocaesia Barneby
- Mimosa flocculosa Burkart
- Mimosa floridana (Chapm.) Weakley & Flores-Cruz
- Mimosa foliolosa Benth.
- Mimosa foreroana Santos-Silva & A.M.G.Azevedo
- Mimosa furfuracea Benth.
- Mimosa galeottii Benth.
- Mimosa gardneri Benth.
- Mimosa gatesiae Barneby
- Mimosa gemmulata Barneby
- Mimosa gentryi Barneby
- Mimosa glabra Benth.
- Mimosa glanduliseta Burkart
- Mimosa glaucula Barneby
- Mimosa glaziovii Benth.
- Mimosa glutinosa Malme
- Mimosa glycyrrhizoides Barneby
- Mimosa goldmanii B.L.Rob.
- Mimosa gracilis Benth.
- Mimosa grahamii A.Gray
- Mimosa grandidieri Baill.
- Mimosa granitica (Barneby) L.M.Borges
- Mimosa guanchezii Barneby
- Mimosa guaranitica Chodat & Hassl.
- Mimosa guatemalensis (Hook. & Arn.) Benth.
- Mimosa guaviarensis Barneby
- Mimosa guilandinae (DC.) Barneby
- Mimosa guirocobensis Gentry
- Mimosa gymnas Barneby
- Mimosa haavoa Villiers
- Mimosa hafomantsina Villiers
- Mimosa hamata Willd.
- Mimosa hapaloclada Malme
- Mimosa hatschbachii Barneby
- Mimosa hebecarpa Benth.
- Mimosa heringeri Barneby
- Mimosa hexandra Micheli
- Mimosa hilariana Barneby
- Mimosa hildebrandtii Drake
- Mimosa hirsuticaulis Harms
- Mimosa hirsutissima Mart.
- Mimosa hondurana Britton
- Mimosa honesta Mart.
- Mimosa hortensis Barneby
- Mimosa huanchacae Barneby
- Mimosa huberi Barneby
- Mimosa humifusa Benth.
- Mimosa humivagans Barneby
- Mimosa hypnodes Barneby
- Mimosa hypoglauca Mart.
- Mimosa hystricina (Small ex Britton & Rose) B.L.Turner
- Mimosa ikondensis Villiers
- Mimosa implexa Benth.
- Mimosa inamoena Benth.
- Mimosa incana Benth.
- Mimosa incarum Barneby
- Mimosa insidiosa Mart.
- Mimosa insignis (Hassl.) Barneby
- Mimosa interrupta Benth.
- Mimosa intricata Benth.
- Mimosa invisa Mart. ex Colla
- Mimosa involucrata Benth.
- Mimosa iperoensis Hoehne
- Mimosa irrigua Barneby
- Mimosa irwinii Barneby
- Mimosa itatiaiensis Dusén
- Mimosa jacobita Barneby
- Mimosa jaenensis Särkinen, Marcelo-Peña & C.E.Hughes
- Mimosa josephina Barneby
- Mimosa kalunga Marc.F.Simon & C.E.Hughes
- Mimosa kermesina A.Dietr.
- Mimosa kitrokala Villiers
- Mimosa kuhlmannii Hoehne
- Mimosa kuhnisteroides Barneby
- Mimosa lacerata Rose
- Mimosa lactiflua Delile ex Benth.
- Mimosa lamolina C.E.Hughes & G.P.Lewis
- Mimosa lanata Benth.
- Mimosa laniceps Barneby
- Mimosa lanuginosa Glaz. ex Burkart
- Mimosa lasiocephala Benth.
- Mimosa laticifera Rizzini & N.F.Mattos
- Mimosa latidens (Small) B.L.Turner
- Mimosa latispinosa Lam.
- Mimosa lawranceana Britton & Killip
- Mimosa leimonias Barneby & Fortunato
- Mimosa leiocephala Benth.
- Mimosa lemniscata Barneby
- Mimosa leonardii Britton & Rose
- Mimosa lepidophora Rizzini
- Mimosa lepidorepens Burkart
- Mimosa lepidota Herzog
- Mimosa leprosa (Bong. ex Benth.) J.F.Macbr.
- Mimosa leptantha Benth.
- Mimosa leptocarpa Rose
- Mimosa leptorhachis Benth.
- Mimosa leucaenoides Benth.
- Mimosa levenensis Drake
- Mimosa lewisii Barneby
- Mimosa lingvatouana (Baill.) Villiers
- Mimosa lithoreas Barneby
- Mimosa longepedunculata Taub.
- Mimosa longipes Benth.
- Mimosa longiracemosa (Burkart) Barneby
- Mimosa longistipula V.F.Dutra & F.C.P.Garcia
- Mimosa loxensis Barneby
- Mimosa luciana Barneby
- Mimosa luisana Brandegee
- Mimosa lundiana Benth.
- Mimosa lupinoides Chodat & Hassl.
- Mimosa macedoana Burkart
- Mimosa macrocalyx Micheli
- Mimosa macrocephala Benth.
- Mimosa macropogon Barneby
- Mimosa magentea Izag. & Beyhaut
- Mimosa maguirei Barneby
- Mimosa mahilakensis Villiers
- Mimosa mainaea Villiers
- Mimosa malacophylla A.Gray
- Mimosa manidea Barneby
- Mimosa manomboensis G.Lefèvre & Labat
- Mimosa maracayuensis Chodat & Hassl.
- Mimosa margaritae Rose
- Mimosa martin-delcampoi Medrano
- Mimosa medioxima Barneby
- Mimosa melanocarpa Benth.
- Mimosa mellii Britton & Rose
- Mimosa menabeensis R.Vig.
- Mimosa mensicola Barneby
- Mimosa microcarpa Benth.
- Mimosa microcephala Humb. & Bonpl. ex Willd.
- Mimosa micropteris Benth.
- Mimosa minarum Barneby
- Mimosa minutifolia B.L.Rob. & Greenm.
- Mimosa miranda Barneby
- Mimosa misera Benth.
- Mimosa mitzi V.F.Dutra & F.C.P.Garcia
- Mimosa modesta Mart.
- Mimosa mollis Benth.
- Mimosa monacensis Barneby
- Mimosa monancistra Benth.
- Mimosa monclovensis R.Grether & Marc.F.Simon
- Mimosa moniliformis (Britton & Rose) R.Grether & Barneby
- Mimosa montana Kunth
- Mimosa monticola Dusén
- Mimosa montis-carasae Barneby
- Mimosa morongii Britton
- Mimosa morroensis Barneby
- Mimosa mossambicensis Brenan
- Mimosa multiceps Barneby
- Mimosa multiplex Benth.
- Mimosa murex Barneby
- Mimosa myriacantha Baker
- Mimosa myriadenia (Benth.) Benth.
- Mimosa myriocephala Baker
- Mimosa myrioglandulosa V.F.Dutra & F.C.P.Garcia
- Mimosa myriophylla Bong. ex Benth.
- Mimosa myuros Barneby
- Mimosa nanchititlana R.Grether & Barneby
- Mimosa neonitens L.M.Borges
- Mimosa neptunioides Harms
- Mimosa niederleinii Burkart
- Mimosa niomarlei Afr.Fern.
- Mimosa nitens Benth.
- Mimosa nitidula Barneby
- Mimosa nossibiensis Benth.
- Mimosa nothacacia Barneby
- Mimosa nothopteris Barneby
- Mimosa nycteridis Barneby
- Mimosa oblonga Benth.
- Mimosa obstrigosa Burkart
- Mimosa occidentalis Britton & Rose
- Mimosa oedoclada Barneby
- Mimosa oligophylla Micheli
- Mimosa oligosperma Barneby
- Mimosa onilahensis R.Vig.
- Mimosa ophthalmocentra Mart. ex Benth.
- Mimosa orbignyana Barneby
- Mimosa orinocoensis Barneby
- Mimosa orthacantha Benth.
- Mimosa orthocarpa Spruce ex Benth.
- Mimosa osmarii Jordão, M.P.Morim, Baumgratz & Marc.F.Simon
- Mimosa ostenii Speg. ex Burkart
- Mimosa ourobrancoensis Burkart
- Mimosa pabstiana Barneby
- Mimosa pachycarpoides Malme
- Mimosa palmeri Rose
- Mimosa palmetorum Barneby
- Mimosa paludosa Benth.
- Mimosa papposa Benth.
- Mimosa paraguariae Micheli
- Mimosa paraibana Barneby
- Mimosa paranapiacabae Barneby
- Mimosa parviceps Barneby
- Mimosa parvifoliolata Alain
- Mimosa parvipinna Benth.
- Mimosa paucifolia Benth.
- Mimosa pauli Barneby
- Mimosa paupera Benth.
- Mimosa pectinatipinna Burkart
- Mimosa pedersenii Barneby
- Mimosa peduncularis Bong. ex Benth.
- Mimosa pedunculosa Micheli
- Mimosa per-dusenii Burkart
- Mimosa perplicata L.M.Borges
- Mimosa petiolaris Benth.
- Mimosa petraea Chodat & Hassl.
- Mimosa phyllodinea Benth.
- Mimosa pigra L.
- Mimosa pilulifera Benth.
- Mimosa pinetorum Standl.
- Mimosa piptoptera Barneby
- Mimosa piresii Barneby
- Mimosa piscatorum Barneby
- Mimosa pithecolobioides Benth.
- Mimosa planitei Villiers
- Mimosa platycarpa Benth.
- Mimosa platyphylla Benth.
- Mimosa plumosa Micheli
- Mimosa poculata Barneby
- Mimosa pogocephala Benth.
- Mimosa pogonoclada Benth.
- Mimosa polyantha Benth.
- Mimosa polycarpa Kunth
- Mimosa polycephala Benth.
- Mimosa polydactyla Humb. & Bonpl. ex Willd.
- Mimosa polydidyma Barneby
- Mimosa porrecta Jordão, M.P.Lima & Baumgratz
- Mimosa prainiana Gamble
- Mimosa pratincola Barneby
- Mimosa pringlei S.Watson
- Mimosa prionopus Barneby
- Mimosa procurrens Benth.
- Mimosa prorepens Barneby
- Mimosa pseudocallosa Burkart
- Mimosa pseudofoliolosa Barneby
- Mimosa pseudolepidota (Burkart) Barneby
- Mimosa pseudopetiolaris Barneby
- Mimosa pseudoradula Glaz. ex Barneby
- Mimosa pseudosepiaria Harms
- Mimosa pseudotrachycarpa Barneby
- Mimosa psilocarpa B.L.Rob.
- Mimosa psittacina Barneby
- Mimosa psoralea Benth.
- Mimosa pteridifolia Benth.
- Mimosa puberula Benth.
- Mimosa pudica L.
- Mimosa pumilio Barneby
- Mimosa purpusii Brandegee
- Mimosa pusilliceps Barneby
- Mimosa pycnocoma Benth.
- Mimosa pyrenea Taub.
- Mimosa quadrivalvis L.
- Mimosa quitensis Benth.
- Mimosa radula Benth.
- Mimosa ramboi Burkart
- Mimosa ramentacea Burkart
- Mimosa ramosissima Benth.
- Mimosa ramulosa Benth.
- Mimosa rastrera Atahuachi & C.E.Hughes
- Mimosa rava Barneby
- Mimosa reduviosa Barneby
- Mimosa regina Barneby
- Mimosa regnellii Benth.
- Mimosa reptans Benth.
- Mimosa revoluta Benth.
- Mimosa rheiptera Barneby
- Mimosa rhodocarpa (Britton & Rose) R.Grether
- Mimosa rhododactyla B.L.Rob.
- Mimosa rhodostegia Barneby
- Mimosa riedelii Benth.
- Mimosa riverensis Izag. & Beyhaut
- Mimosa robusta R.Grether
- Mimosa rocae Lorentz & Niederl.
- Mimosa rojasii Hassl.
- Mimosa rokatavensis Villiers
- Mimosa rondoniana Hoehne
- Mimosa rosei B.L.Rob.
- Mimosa roseoalba Sav.-Cout. & G.P.Lewis
- Mimosa rubicaulis Lam.
- Mimosa rubra V.F.Dutra & F.C.P.Garcia
- Mimosa rufescens Benth.
- Mimosa rufipila Benth.
- Mimosa rupestris Benth.
- Mimosa rupigena (Barneby) L.M.Borges
- Mimosa rusbyana Barneby & Fortunato
- Mimosa sanguinolenta Barneby
- Mimosa savokaea Villiers
- Mimosa scaberrima Hoehne
- Mimosa scabrella Benth.
- Mimosa sceptrum Barneby
- Mimosa schininii M.Morales, Grohar & Fortunato
- Mimosa schleidenii Herter
- Mimosa schomburgkii Benth.
- Mimosa schrankioides Benth.
- Mimosa selloi Benth.
- Mimosa sensibilis Griseb.
- Mimosa sensitiva L.
- Mimosa sericantha Benth.
- Mimosa serpensetosa L.M.Borges
- Mimosa serra Burkart
- Mimosa setifera Pilg.
- Mimosa setistipula Benth.
- Mimosa setosa Benth.
- Mimosa setosissima Taub.
- Mimosa setuligera Harms
- Mimosa setuliseta Villarreal
- Mimosa sicyocarpa B.L.Rob.
- Mimosa similis Britton & Rose
- Mimosa simplicissima Barneby
- Mimosa sinaloensis Britton & Rose
- Mimosa skinneri Benth.
- Mimosa sobralii Grings & Ribas
- Mimosa somnambulans Barneby
- Mimosa somnians Humb. & Bonpl. ex Willd.
- Mimosa sotoi R.Grether & V.W.Steinm.
- Mimosa sousae R.Grether
- Mimosa sparsa Benth.
- Mimosa sparsiformis Barneby
- Mimosa speciosissima Taub.
- Mimosa spirocarpa Rose
- Mimosa spixiana Barneby
- Mimosa splendida Barneby
- Mimosa sprengelii DC.
- Mimosa strigillosa Torr. & A.Gray
- Mimosa strobiliflora Burkart
- Mimosa struthionoptera Barneby
- Mimosa stylosa Barneby
- Mimosa subenervis Benth.
- Mimosa suberosa Atahuachi & C.E.Hughes
- Mimosa subinermis Benth.
- Mimosa suburbana Barneby
- Mimosa suffruticosa (Vatke) Drake
- Mimosa supravisa Barneby
- Mimosa surumuensis Harms
- Mimosa taimbensis Burkart
- Mimosa tanalarum R.Vig.
- Mimosa tandilensis Speg.
- Mimosa tarda Barneby
- Mimosa tejupilcana R.Grether & Mart.-Bern.
- Mimosa teledactyla Donn.Sm.
- Mimosa tenuiflora (Willd.) Poir.
- Mimosa tenuipendula Burkart
- Mimosa tequilana S.Watson
- Mimosa terribilis Marchiori & Sobral ex Schmidt Silveira & Miotto
- Mimosa tetragona Poir.
- Mimosa texana (A.Gray) Small
- Mimosa thermarum Barneby
- Mimosa thomista Barneby
- Mimosa tobatiensis Barneby & Fortunato
- Mimosa tocantina Taub.
- Mimosa torresiae R.Grether
- Mimosa townsendii Barneby
- Mimosa trianae Benth.
- Mimosa tricephala Schltdl. & Cham.
- Mimosa trichocephala Benth.
- Mimosa trinerva V.F.Dutra & F.C.P.Garcia
- Mimosa troncosoae Fortunato & Barneby
- Mimosa tucumensis Barneby ex Ribas, M.Morales & Santos-Silva
- Mimosa turneri Barneby
- Mimosa tweedieana Barneby ex Glazier & Mackinder
- Mimosa ulbrichiana Harms
- Mimosa ulei Taub.
- Mimosa uliginosa Chodat & Hassl.
- Mimosa uniceps Barneby
- Mimosa uninervis (Chodat & Hassl.) Hassl.
- Mimosa unipinnata B.D.Parfitt & Pinkava
- Mimosa uraguensis Hook. & Arn.
- Mimosa urandiensis Santos-Silva, Marc.F.Simon & A.M.G.Azevedo
- Mimosa urbica (Barneby) Marc.F.Simon
- Mimosa uribeana Barneby
- Mimosa ursina Mart.
- Mimosa urticaria Barneby
- Mimosa velloziana Mart.
- Mimosa venatorum Barneby
- Mimosa verecunda Benth.
- Mimosa verrucosa Benth.
- Mimosa vestita Benth.
- Mimosa vexans Barneby
- Mimosa vilersii Drake
- Mimosa viperina Marc.F.Simon & C.E.Hughes
- Mimosa virgula Barneby
- Mimosa viva L.
- Mimosa volubilis Villiers
- Mimosa waterlotii R.Vig.
- Mimosa watsonii B.L.Rob.
- Mimosa weberbaueri Harms
- Mimosa weddelliana Benth.
- Mimosa widgrenii Harms
- Mimosa williamsii Rusby
- Mimosa woodii Atahuachi & C.E.Hughes
- Mimosa xanthocentra Mart.
- Mimosa xiquexiquensis Barneby
- Mimosa xochipalensis R.Grether
- Mimosa zimapanensis Britton
- Mimosa zygophylla Benth.
