= Rapid plant movement =

Short period movement of plants

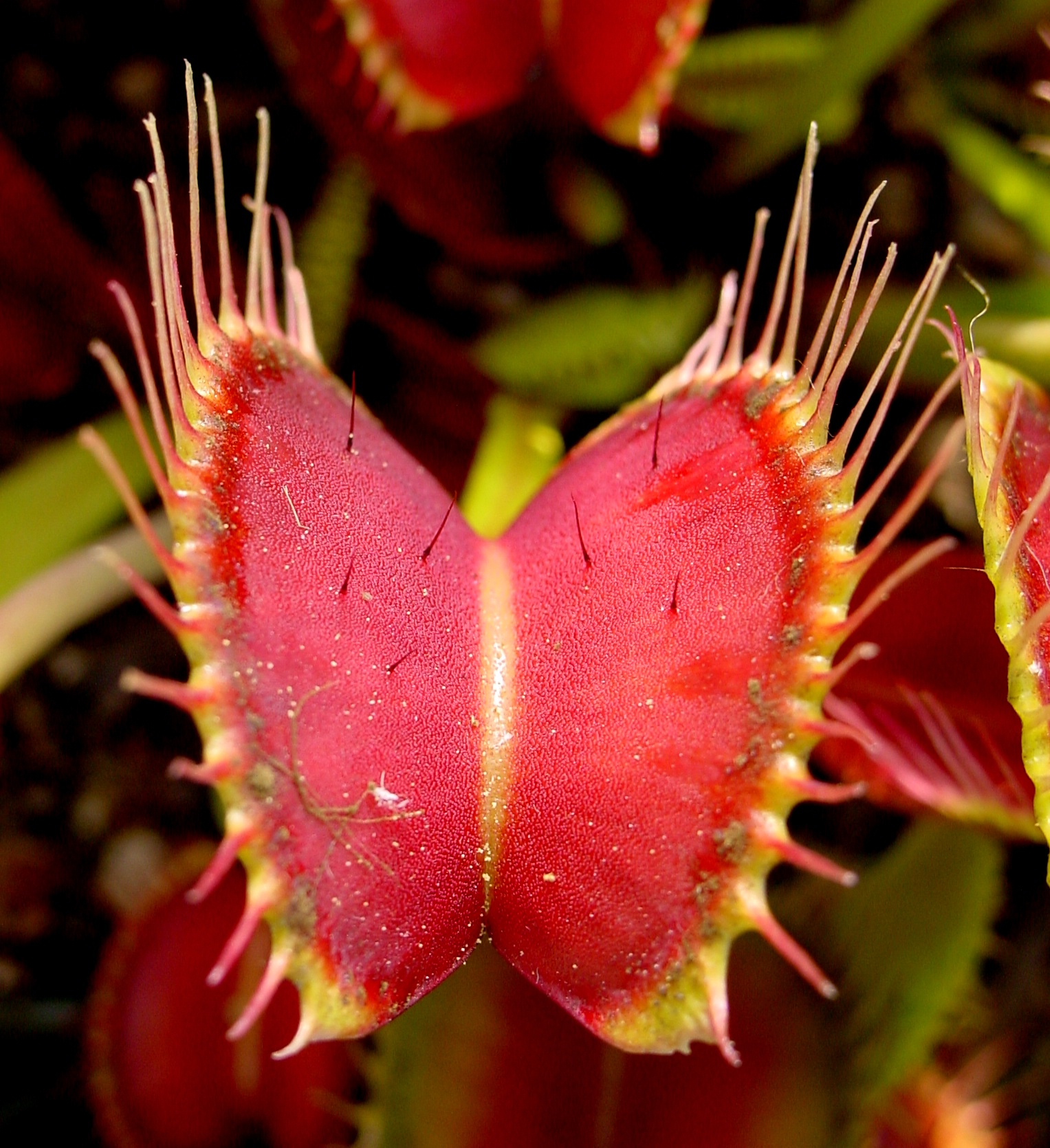
The Venus flytrap is one of a very small group of plants that are capable of rapid movement.

Rapid plant movement encompasses movement in plant structures occurring over a very short period, usually under one second. For example, the Venus flytrap closes its trap in about 100 milliseconds. The traps of Utricularia are much faster, closing in about 0.5 milliseconds. The dogwood bunchberry's flower opens its petals and fires pollen in less than 0.5 milliseconds. The record is currently held by the white mulberry tree, with flower movement taking 25 microseconds, as pollen is catapulted from the stamens at velocities in excess of half the speed of sound—near the theoretical physical limits for movements in plants.

These rapid plant movements differ from the more common, but much slower "growth-movements" of plants, called tropisms. Tropisms encompass movements that lead to physical, permanent alterations of the plant while rapid plant movements are usually reversible or occur over a shorter span of time.

A variety of mechanisms are employed by plants in order to achieve these fast movements. Extremely fast movements such as the explosive spore dispersal techniques of Sphagnum mosses may involve increasing internal pressure via dehydration, causing a sudden propulsion of spores up or through the rapid opening of the "flower" opening triggered by insect pollination. Fast movement can also be demonstrated in predatory plants, where the mechanical stimulation of insect movement creates an electrical action potential and a release of elastic energy within the plant tissues. This release can be seen in the closing of a Venus flytrap, the curling of sundew leaves, and in the trapdoor action and suction of bladderworts. Slower movement, such as the folding of Mimosa pudica leaves, may depend on reversible, but drastic or uneven changes in water pressure in the plant tissues This process is controlled by the fluctuation of ions in and out of the cell, and the osmotic response of water to the ion flux.

In 1880 Charles Darwin published The Power of Movement in Plants, his second-to-last work before his death.

== Plants that capture and consume prey ==
- Venus flytrap (Dionaea muscipula)
- Waterwheel plant (Aldrovanda vesiculosa)
- Bladderwort (Utricularia)
- Certain varieties of sundew (Drosera)

== Plants that move leaves and leaflets ==
Plants that are able to rapidly move their leaves or their leaflets in response to mechanical stimulation such as touch (thigmonasty):

Mimosa pudica leaves closing after being touched

Timelapse video of rotating Codariocalyx motorius leaflets

- Aeschynomene:
  - Large leaf sensitive plant (Aeschynomene fluitans)
  - Aeschynomene americana
  - Aeschynomene deightonii
- Starfruit (Averrhoa carambola)
- Biophytum:
  - Biophytum abyssinicum
  - Biophytum helenae
  - Biophytum petersianum
  - Biophytum reinwardtii
  - Biophytum sensitivum
- River tamarind (Leucaena leucocephala)
- Chamaecrista:
  - Partridge pea (Chamaecrista fasciculata)
  - Sensitive partridge pea (Chamaecrista nictitans)
  - Chamaecrista mimosoides L.
- Mimosa:
  - Giant false sensitive plant (Mimosa diplotricha)
  - Catclaw brier (Mimosa nuttallii)
  - Giant sensitive plant (Mimosa pigra)
  - Mimosa polyantha
  - Mimosa polycarpa var. spegazzinii
  - Mimosa polydactyla
  - Sensitive plant (Mimosa pudica)
  - Roemer sensitive briar (Mimosa roemeriana)
  - Eastern sensitive plant, sensitive briar (Mimosa rupertiana)
  - Mimosa uruguensis
- Neptunia:
  - Yellow neptunia (Neptunia lutea)
  - Sensitive neptunia (Neptunia oleracea)
  - Neptunia plena
  - Neptunia gracili
- Senna alata

Plants that move their leaves or leaflets at speeds rapid enough to be perceivable with the naked eye:

- Telegraph plant (Codariocalyx motorius)

== Plants that spread seeds or pollen by rapid movement ==
- Squirting cucumber (Ecballium elaterium)
- Cardamine hirsuta and other Cardamine spp. have seed pods which explode when touched.
- Impatiens (Impatiens)
- Sandbox tree
- Triggerplant (all Stylidium species)
- Canadian dwarf cornel (aka dogwood bunchberry, Cornus canadensis)
- White mulberry (Morus alba)
- Orchids (all genus Catasetum)
- Dwarf mistletoe (Arceuthobium)
- Witch-hazel (Hamamelis)
- Wood-sorrel (Oxalis)
- Some Fabaceae have beans that twist as they dry out, putting tension on the seam, which at some point will split suddenly and violently, flinging the seeds metres from the maternal plant.
- Marantaceae
- Minnieroot (Ruellia tuberosa)
- Peyote (Lophophora williamsii) stamens move in response to touch

== See also ==
- Kinesis (biology)
- Nastic movements
- Phytosemiotics
- Plant bioacoustics
- Plant perception (physiology)
- Taxis
- Thigmonasty
- Tropism
