= Thigmonasty =

Undirected movement in response to touch or vibration

Mimosa pudica in normal and touched state.

In biology, thigmonasty or seismonasty is the nastic (non-directional) response of a plant or fungus to touch or vibration. Conspicuous examples of thigmonasty include many species in the leguminous subfamily Mimosoideae, active carnivorous plants such as Dionaea and a wide range of pollination mechanisms.

== Distinctive aspects ==
Thigmonasty differs from thigmotropism in that nastic motion is independent of the direction of the stimulus. For example, tendrils from a climbing plant are thigmotropic because they twine around any support they touch, responding in whichever direction the stimulus came from. However, the shutting of a venus fly trap is thigmonastic; no matter what the direction of the stimulus, the trap simply shuts (and later possibly opens).

The time scales of thigmonastic responses tend to be shorter than those of thigmotropic movements because many examples of thigmonasty depend on pre-accumulated turgor or on bistable mechanisms rather than growth or cell division. Certain dramatic examples of rapid plant movement such as the sudden drooping of Mimosa pudica or the trapping action of Dionaea or Utricularia are fast enough to observe without time-lapse photography; some take less than a second. Speed is no clear distinction however; for example the re-erection of Mimosa leaves is nastic, but typically takes some 15 to 30 minutes, rather than a second or so. Similarly, re-opening of the Dionaea trap, though also nastic, typically takes days to complete.

Botanical physiologists have discovered signalling molecules called turgorins, that help mediate the loss of turgor. In species with the fastest response time, vacuoles are believed to provide temporary, high speed storage for calcium ions.

== Examples of plants exhibiting thigmonasty ==
=== In the Asteraceae ===
Thigmonasty other than leaf closure occurs in various species of thistles. When an insect lands on a flower, the anthers shrink and rebound, loading the insect with pollen. The effect results from turgor changes in specialized, highly elastic cell walls of the anthers. Similar pollination strategy occurs in Rudbeckia hirta.

=== In the Droseraceae ===
The Venus flytrap (Dionaea muscipula) presents a spectacular example of thigmonasty; when an insect lands on a trap formed by two curved lobes of a single leaf, the trap rapidly switches from an open to a closed configuration. Investigators have observed an action potential and changes in leaf turgor that accompany the reflex; they trigger the rapid elongation of individual cells. The common term for the elongation is acid growth although the process does not involve cell division.

The sundews (genus Drosera) are all capable of moving their glandular tentacles toward the center of a leaf in response to a prey item landing on it. The speed of the movement varies by species.

=== In the Fabaceae ===
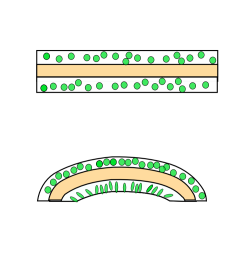
Pulvinus in extended and contracted position

Mimosa pudica is a plant with compound leaves that droop abruptly when stimulated. This is a classic example of thigmonastic action and has attracted detailed investigation. Contact or injury that causes leaflets to deform will trigger an action potential. The action potential travels through the plant, initiating drooping of the leaflets as it passes. However, it does not pass the pulvinus at the base of a petiole, and so a local disturbance will not cause all the leaves on the plant to collapse.

The pulvinus is a motor structure consisting of a rod of sclerenchyma surrounded by collenchyma. Such pulvini occur widely in the Fabaceae. In its extended position, the cells of the entire collar of collenchyma are distended with water. On receiving the action potential signal, the cells in the lower half of the pulvinus respond by expelling potassium and chlorine ions and taking up of calcium ions. This results in an osmotic gradient that draws water out of the affected cells, so that they temporarily shrink. This pulls the entire structure downward like a folding fan.

Many other Fabaceae react to touch with the same rapid leaf closure motion. The pea vine thigmonastically closes its leaves around a support. Catclaw Brier, a prairie mimosa, native to North America, shuts its leaves on contact. The plant is attractive to herbivores, and this behavior presumably provides protection against grazing.

=== In the Loasaceae ===
Members of the subfamily Loasoideae exhibit rapid stamen movement when pollinators are present. In order to obtain nectar, specialized floral components known as nectar scales must be manipulated by the pollinator. This action causes the stamens to move between 90 and 120 degrees toward the center of the flower within 1-2 minutes. When there is a lack of pollinators the stamen movement is slower and dependent upon ambient light and temperature. The plants are capable of extending their staminate and carpellate phases to ensure self-pollination.

=== In the Oxalidaceae ===
Sensitive leaves also occur in plants of the wood sorrel family. Examples include many species of Oxalis, Biophytum sensitivum, and Averrhoa carambola (the plant which produces starfruit).

=== Other forms ===
Some fungi exhibit trap closure similar to the venus fly trap. Mycologists have discovered action potentials in fungi but it is not currently clear whether they have any significance to thigmonastic behavior.

== See also ==
- Apoplast
- Rapid plant movement
