= Outline of botany =

Overview of and topical guide to botany

The following outline is an overview of and topical guide to botany, the biological academic discipline involving the study of plants.

== Core concepts ==
- Bud
- Cell wall
- Chlorophyll
- Chloroplast
- Flora
- Flower
- Fruit
- Forest
- Leaf
- Meristem
- Photosynthesis
- Plant
- Plant cell
- Pollen
- Seed
- Seedling
- Spore
- Tree
- Vine
- Wood

== Subdisciplines ==
Branches of botany

=== Core branches ===
- Molecular botany – study of plants at a molecular level (DNA, RNA, etc.)
- Palynology – study of pollen and spores
- Phytochemistry – study of chemicals derived from plants, especially the structures of the large number of secondary metabolites found in plants, the functions of these compounds in human and plant biology, and the biosynthesis of these compounds
- Plant anatomy/Phytotomy – study of the internal structure of plants, i.e., the structure of plant cells and tissues
- Plant biochemistry – study of chemical processes of primary and secondary metabolism
- Plant cell biology – study of the structure (ultrastructure) and function (cell physiology) of plant cell
- Plant cytology – study of the structure and function of plant cells, including their organelles and components
- Plant developmental biology – study of how a single plant cell grows and develops into a complex, multicellular organism
- Plant evolution – subset of evolutionary phenomena that concern plants
- Plant evolutionary developmental biology – study of plant developmental programs and patterns from an evolutionary perspective
- Plant genetics – study of genes, genetic variation, and heredity specifically in plants
- Plant histology – study of the microscopic structure of plant tissues
- Plant morphology – study of the physical form and external structure of plants
- Plant physiology – study of fundamental processes of plants (photosynthesis, transpiration, nutrient uptake, etc.)
- Plant reproductive biology – study of how plants reproduce using both sexual and asexual methods

=== Classification ===
- Bryology – study of mosses, hornworts and liverworts
- Dendrology – study of woody plants (shrubs, trees and lianas) and their taxonomic classifications
- Floristics - branch of phytogeography which studies plants in a specific geographical region
- Lichenology – study of lichens
- Mycology – study of fungi
- Phycology/Algology – study of algae
- Phytogeography/Plant Biogeography – study of plant distributions
- Phytosociology/Phytocoenology/Plant sociology – study of groups of species of plant that are usually found together in a community and their interactions
- Plant systematics – study of plant classification and evolutionary relationships
- Plant taxonomy – science that finds, identifies, describes, classifies, and names plants
- Pteridology – study of ferns

=== Environment and ecology ===
- Plant ecology – subdiscipline of ecology that studies the distribution and abundance of plants, the effects of environmental factors upon the abundance of plants, and the interactions among plants and between plants and other organisms
- Geobotany/Botanical geography – branch of biogeography that is concerned with the geographic distribution of plant species and their influence on the Earth's surface
- Conservation biology – study of the conservation of nature and of Earth's biodiversity with the aim of protecting species, their habitats, and ecosystems
- Invasion biology – study of invasive species dynamics
- Astrobotany – study of plants in space environments

=== Historical ===
- Paleobotany – study of fossil plants
- Paleoethnobotany/Archaeobotany – study of past human-plant interactions through the recovery and analysis of ancient plant remains
- Paleophycology/Paleoalgology – subdiscipline of paleobotany dealing with the study and identification of fossil algae and their evolutionary relationships and ecology

=== Applied ===
- Agroforestry/Agro-sylviculture/fForest farming – polyculture land use management system that integrates trees with crops or pasture, combining agricultural and forestry technologies
- Agronomy – science and technology of producing and using plants by agriculture for food, fuel, fiber, chemicals, recreation, or land conservation
- Arboriculture – culture and propagation of trees
- Economic botany – study of the relationship between people (individuals and cultures) and plants of economic use and value.
- Ethnobotany – interdisciplinary field that studies the relationships between humans and plants, focusing on traditional knowledge of how plants are selected, used, managed, and perceived in human societies
- Floriculture – branch of horticulture which studies the efficient production of the plants that produce showy, colorful flowers and foliage for human enjoyment in human environments
- Forestry – management and conservation of forests
- Horticulture – cultivation of garden plants
- Marine botany – study of aquatic plants and algae that live in seawater
- Olericulture – study of vegetables
- Plant biotechnology – technology to modify plants and using plants to synthesize products
- Plant breeding – science of changing the traits of plants in order to produce desired characteristics and improve the quality of plant products for use by humans and animals
- Pomology – study of fruits and nuts and their cultivation
- Silviculture – practice of controlling the growth, composition/structure, as well as quality of forests to meet values and needs, specifically timber production
- Viticulture/Viniculture/Winegrowing – branch of horticulture dealing with the cultivation and harvesting of grapes

=== Disease ===
- Plant pathology/Phytopathology – study of plant diseases
- Plant bacteriology – study of bacteria that cause diseases in plants.
- Plant virology – study of viruses that infect plants
- Plant nematology – study of nematodes that parasitize plants
- Plant parasitology – study of parasitic plants
- Plant disease epidemiology – study of how plant diseases develop and spread within populations of plants

=== Emerging and nontraditional ===
- Plant intelligence/Plant neurobiology – study of how plants process information from and sense, communicate, and respond to their environment
- Plant bioacoustics – study of how plants produce, perceive, and respond to sounds and vibrations in their environment

== Plant physiology ==
- Metabolism & Nutrition
  - Photosynthesis
    - Chlorophyll
  - Respiration
    - Cellular respiration
  - Plant nutrition
    - Aleurone
    - Phytomelanin
  - Cellulose
  - Starch
  - Sugar
  - Sap
- Water Relations & Gas Exchange
  - Bulk flow
  - Transpiration
  - Turgor pressure
  - Water potential
  - Gas exchange
- Plant growth and development
  - Plant growth
    - Apical dominance
    - Plant hormone
      - Auxin
      - Gibberellin
      - Cytokinin
  - Photomorphogenesis
  - Circadian rhythm
  - Plant development
    - Seed germination
    - Dormancy
    - Photoperiodism
- Responses to Stimuli
  - Tropism
    - Gravitropism
    - Phototropism
    - Hydrotropism
    - Thigmotropism
    - Chemotropism
  - Nastic movements
- Environmental stress physiology

== History ==
- History of botany
- History of plant systematics

== Major plant groups ==
- Algae
  - Cyanobacteria
  - Brown algae
  - Charophyta
  - Chlorophyta
  - Desmid
  - Diatom
  - Red algae
  - Green algae
- Bryophytes
  - Anthocerotophyta (hornworts)
  - Bryophyta (mosses)
  - Marchantiophyta (liverworts)
- Pteridophytes
  - Lycopodiophyta (club mosses)
  - Pteridophyta (ferns and horsetails)
  - Rhyniophyta (early plants)
- Gymnosperms
  - Pteridospermatophyta (seed ferns)
  - Cycadophyta
  - Ginkgophyta
  - Gnetophyta
  - Pinophyta (conifers)
- Angiosperms
  - Dicotyledon/Eudicots
    - Asteraceae (sunflowers)
    - Cactaceae (cacti)
    - Fabaceae (legumes)
    - Lamiaceae (mints)
    - Rosaceae (roses)
  - Monocotyledon
    - Araceae (aroids)
    - Arecaceae (palms)
    - Iridaceae (irises)
    - Orchidaceae (orchids)
    - Poaceae (grasses)

=== Lists ===
- List of culinary fruits
- List of edible seeds
- List of culinary herbs and spices
- List of culinary nuts
- List of vegetables
- List of woods

== General species concepts ==
- Plant taxonomy
  - Cultivated plant taxonomy
  - List of systems of plant taxonomy
- Clades
  - Monophyletic
  - Polyphyletic
- Speciation
- Isolating mechanisms
- Concept of species
  - Species problem

== Notable botanists ==
In alphabetical order by surname:

- Aristotle
- Arthur Cronquist (angiosperm evolution)
- Charles Darwin (formulated modern theory of evolution)
- Carl Linnaeus (father of systematics)
- Gregor Mendel (father of genetics)
- John Ray
- G. Ledyard Stebbins (angiosperm evolution)
- Theophrastus (uses and classification)
- Robert Thorne (angiosperm evolution)
- Gilbert White
- List of Russian botanists

== Scholarly societies ==
- American Society of Plant Biologists
