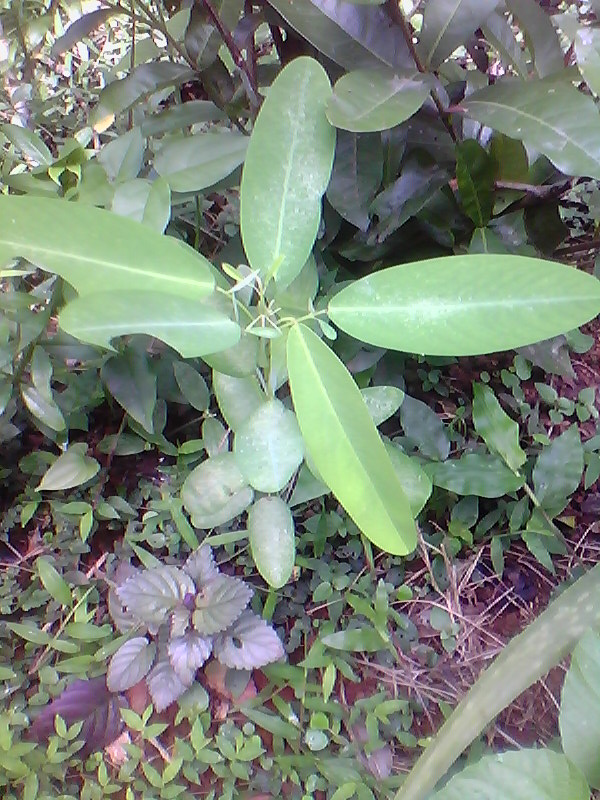

Scientific classification
- Kingdom: Plantae
- Clade: Tracheophytes
- Clade: Angiosperms
- Clade: Eudicots
- Clade: Rosids
- Order: Fabales
- Family: Fabaceae
- Subfamily: Faboideae
- Genus: Codariocalyx
- Species: C. motorius

Binomial name
- Codariocalyx motorius (Houtt.) H. Ohashi

Synonyms
- Codariocalyx gyrans (L. f.) Hassk.; Desmodium gyrans (L.) DC.; Desmodium gyrans (L. f.) DC.; Desmodium gyrans (L.) DC. var. roylei (Wight & Arn.)Baker; Desmodium motorium (Houtt.) Merr.; Desmodium roylei Wight & Arn.; Hedysarum gyrans L. f.; Hedysarum motorium Houtt.; Hedysarum motorius Houtt.; Meibomia gyrans (L. f.) Kuntze

= Codariocalyx motorius =

Species of legume

Codariocalyx motorius (though often placed in Desmodium), known as the telegraph plant, dancing plant, or semaphore plant, is a tropical Asian shrub in the pea family (Fabaceae), one of the few plants capable of rapid movement; other plants include Mimosa pudica, the venus flytrap and Utricularia. The motion occurs in daylight hours when the temperature is above 22° C. Many sources claim that the two leaflets move on a common axis (like the blades of a kayak paddle) even though there is no rigid connection between them.

It is widely distributed throughout Bangladesh, Bhutan, Cambodia, China, India, Indonesia, Laos, Malaysia, Myanmar, Nepal, Pakistan, Sri Lanka, Taiwan, Thailand and Vietnam. It can even be found on the Society Islands, a remote chain of islands in the South Pacific. It produces small, purple flowers which turn orange with time. This plant has small, lateral leaflets which move at speeds rapid enough to be perceivable with the naked eye. This is possibly a strategy to maximise light by tracking the sun. Each leaf is equipped with a hinge that permits it to be moved to receive more sunlight, but the weight of these leaves means the plant must expend a large amount of energy in moving it. To optimise its movement, each large leaf has two small leaflets at its base. These move constantly along an elliptical path, sampling the intensity of sunlight, and directing the large leaf to the area of most intensity. Another hypothesis has been offered that the rapid movements are intended to deter potential predators. It has also been suggested that these movements may be a form of butterfly mimicry to prevent the laying of butterfly eggs on the plant's leaves.

The common name is due to the rotation of the leaflets with a period of about three to five minutes; this was likened to a semaphore telegraph, a structure with adjustable paddles that could be seen from a distance, the position of which conveyed a message in semaphore, hence the common names.

Timelapse video of rotating leaflets

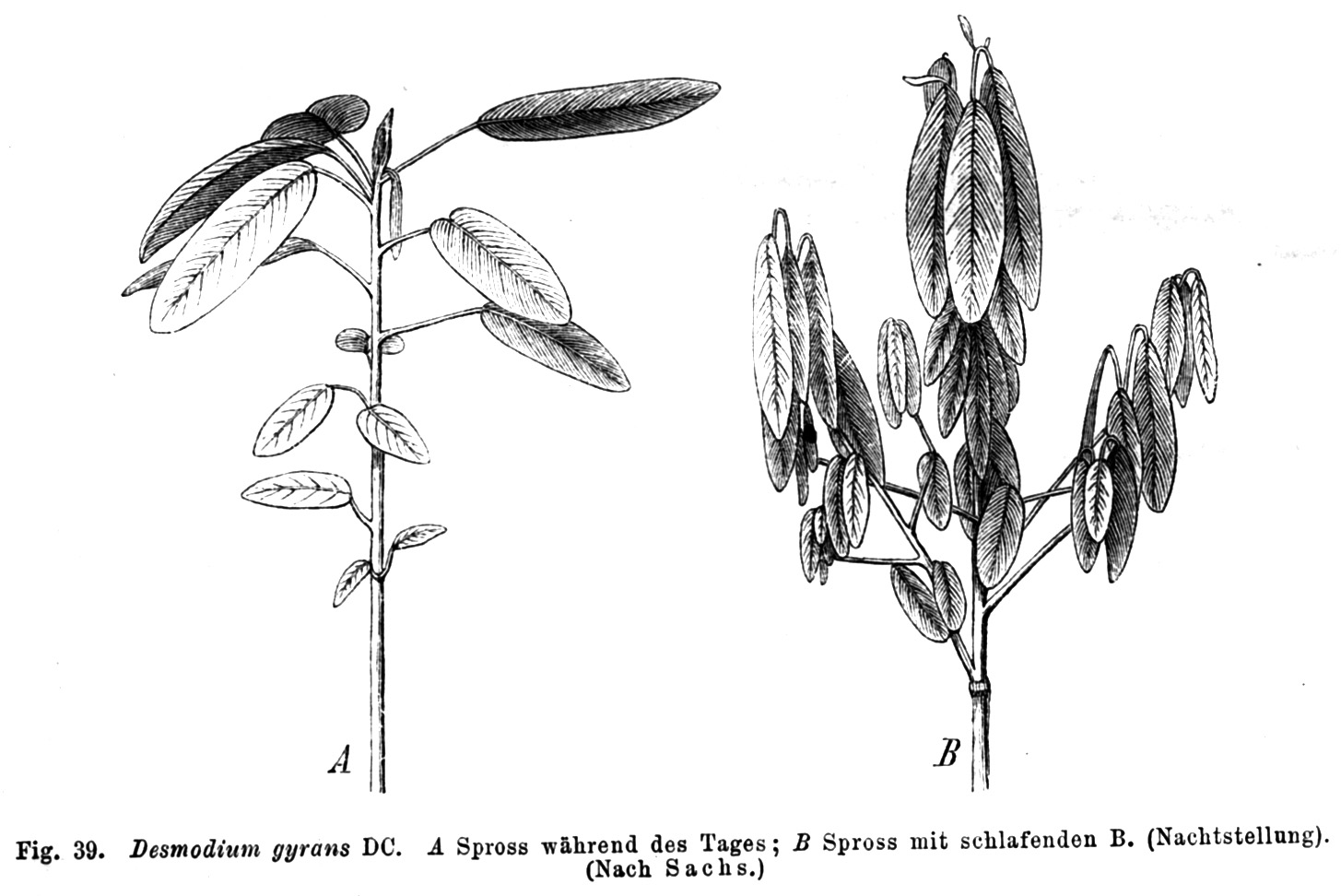
Branch during day (left) and night (right)

The plant is described in detail in Charles Darwin's 1880 The Power of Movement in Plants.

== Phytochemical compositions ==
The leaves, stems, and roots contain trace amounts of tryptamine alkaloids, such as DMT and 5-MeO-DMT.
