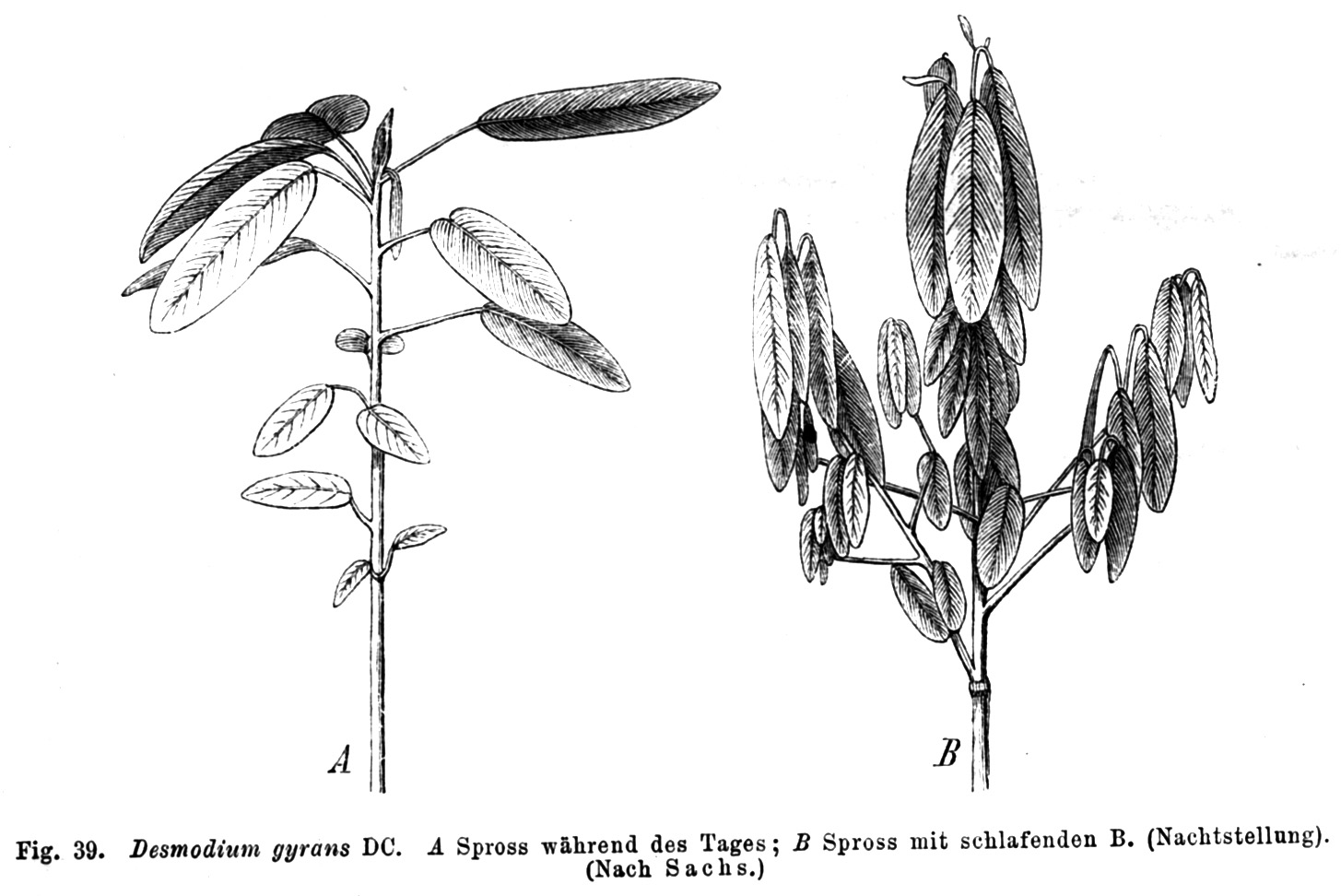
- Codariocalyx motorius

Scientific classification
- Kingdom: Plantae
- Clade: Tracheophytes
- Clade: Angiosperms
- Clade: Eudicots
- Clade: Rosids
- Order: Fabales
- Family: Fabaceae
- Subfamily: Faboideae
- Tribe: Desmodieae
- Subtribe: Desmodiinae
- Genus: Codariocalyx; Hassk. (1841), nom. cons.

Species
- Codariocalyx motorius (Roxb. ex Link) Hassk.; Codariocalyx gyroides (Houtt.) H.Ohashi

Synonyms
- Codoriocalyx Hassk., orth. var.

= Codariocalyx =

Genus of flowering plants

Codariocalyx is a genus of flowering plants in the legume family, Fabaceae. It belongs to subfamily Faboideae. The genus contains two species which range from the Indian Subcontinent, Tibet, Indochina, southern China, Malesia, and New Guinea.

This genus has been largely debated with the genus Desmodium on whether they are separate or the same genus.

- Codariocalyx motorius (Roxb. ex Link) Hassk. – a perennial or shrub ranging from India through Indochina, southern China, and Malesia to New Guinea
- Codariocalyx gyroides (Houtt.) H.Ohashi – a shrub ranging from the Indian subcontinent to Tibet, Indochina, southern China, Taiwan, and Malesia
