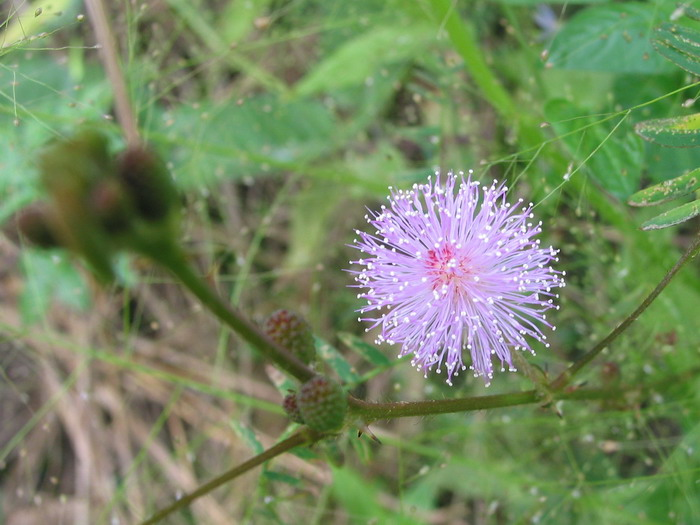

Scientific classification
- Kingdom: Plantae
- Clade: Tracheophytes
- Clade: Angiosperms
- Clade: Eudicots
- Clade: Rosids
- Order: Fabales
- Family: Fabaceae
- Subfamily: Caesalpinioideae
- Clade: Mimosoid clade
- Genus: Mimosa
- Species: M. turneri

Binomial name
- Mimosa turneri Barneby

= Mimosa turneri =

Species of plant

Mimosa turneri, Turner's Mimosa or Turner's Desert Mimosa, is a perennial small to medium-sized shrub native to Trans-Pecos Texas southward through central Coahuila to northwestern Nuevo Leon. It grows between 2 and 5 feet (0.61 and 1.52 m) tall and produces pink flowers.

== Habitat and ecology ==
This uncommon species grows as a small to medium-sized shrub that is localized on limestone soil that can range from 2200 feet to 4000 feet above sea level in the desert. This plant is deciduous and has a very high heat tolerance, allowing it to grow in very hot deserts. These plants live in soil with high alkalinity.

== Morphology ==
Mimosa turneri typically has only 1 pair of pinnae per leaf with 2 pairs of leaflets per pinna.
