= Plant bioacoustics =

Creation of sound waves by plants

Plant bioacoustics refers to the creation of sound waves by plants. Measured sound emissions by plants as well as differential germination rates, growth rates and behavioral modifications in response to sound are well documented. Plants detect neighbors by means other than well-established communicative signals including volatile chemicals, light detection, direct contact and root signaling. Because sound waves travel efficiently through soil and can be produced with minimal energy expenditure, plants may use sound as a means for interpreting their environment and surroundings. Preliminary evidence supports that plants create sound in root tips when cell walls break. Because plant roots respond only to sound waves at frequencies which match waves emitted by the plants themselves, it is likely that plants can receive and transduce sound vibrations into signals to elicit behavioral modifications as a form of below ground communication.

== Sound sensors ==
Buzz pollination, or sonication, serves as an example of a behavioral response to specific frequencies of vibrations in plants. Some 20000 plants species, including Dodecatheon and Heliamphora have evolved buzz pollination in which they release pollen from anthers only when vibrated at a certain frequency created exclusively by bee flight muscles. The vibrations cause pollen granules to gain kinetic energy and escape from pores in the anthers.

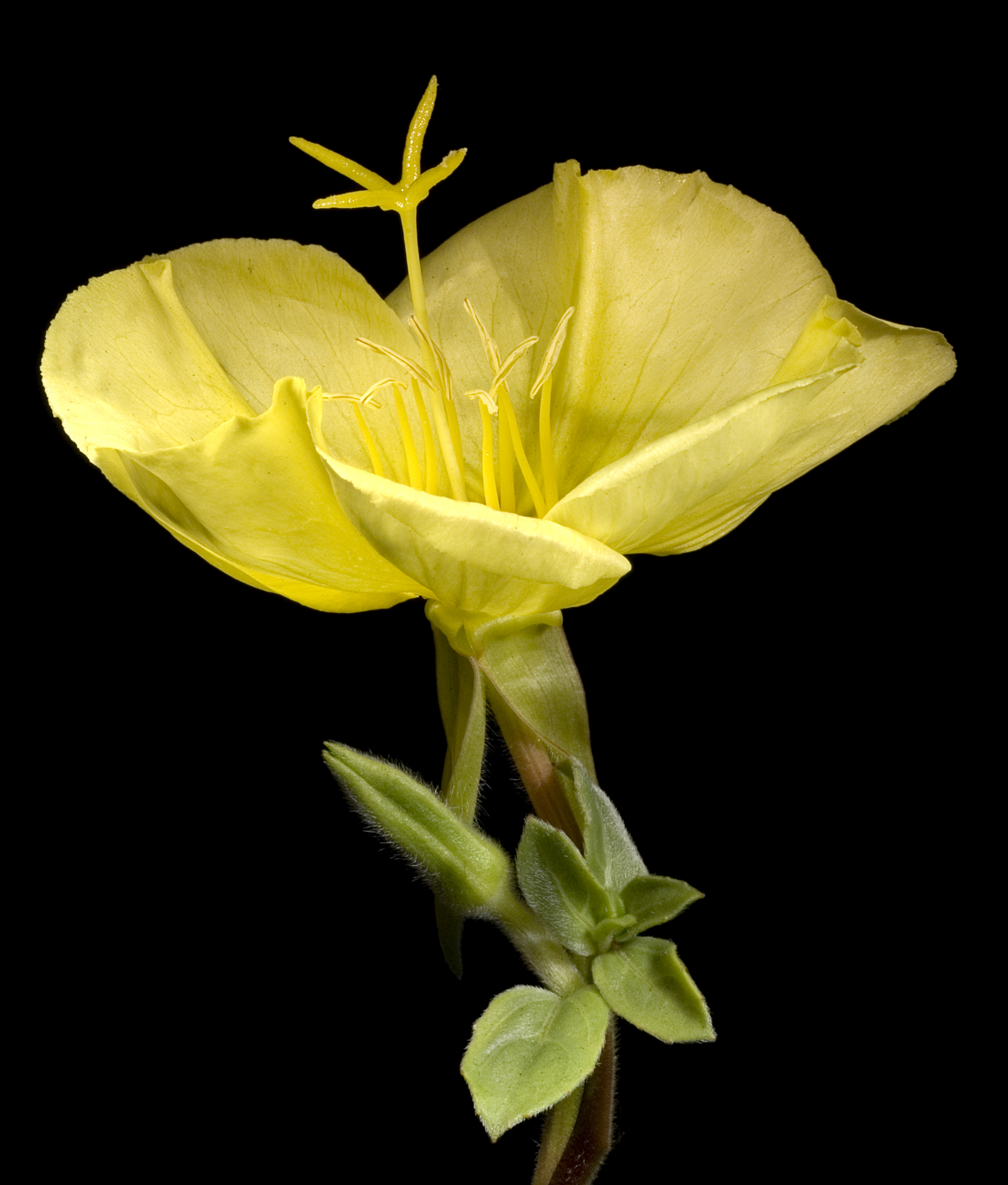
The flower of Oenothera drummondii

Similar to buzz pollination, there's a species of evening primrose that has been shown to respond to bee wing beats and sounds of similar frequencies by producing sweeter nectar. Oenothera drummondii (beach evening primrose) is a perennial subshrub native to the Southeastern United States, but has become naturalized on almost every continent. The plant grows among coastal dunes and sandy environments. It has been discovered that O. drummondii flowers produce significantly sweeter nectar within three minutes when exposed to bee wingbeats and artificial sounds containing similar frequencies. A possibility for this behavior is the fact that if the plant can sense when a pollinator is nearby, there is a high probability another pollinator will be in the area momentarily. In order to increase the chance of pollination, nectar with a higher sugar concentration is produced. It has been hypothesized that the flower serves as the "ear" which contains mechanoreceptors on the plasma membranes of the cells to detect mechanical vibration.

A possible mechanism behind this is the activation of mechanoreceptors by sound waves, which causes a flux of Ca^{2+} into the plant cell causing it to depolarize Because of the specific frequencies produced by the pollinators' wings, perhaps only a distinct amount of Ca^{2+} enters the cell, which would ultimately determine the plant hormones and expression of genes involved in the downstream effect. Research has shown that there is a calmodulin-like gene that could be a sensor of Ca^{2+} concentrations in cells, therefore amounts of Ca^{2+} in a plant cell could have substantial effects over the response of a stimuli. Due to the hormones and genes expressed in the petals of the flower, the transport of sugar into the nectar was increased by about 20%, giving it a higher concentration than compared to the nectar of flowers that were exposed to higher frequencies or no sound at all. An LDV (Laser Doppler vibrometer) was used to determine if the recordings would result in vibration of the petals. Petal velocity was shown in response to a honey bee and moth sound signal as well as low frequency feedbacks, but not high frequency feedbacks.

Sugar concentrations of nectar was measured before and after the plants were exposed to sound; significant increase in sugar concentration was only observed when the low frequency (similar to bee wingbeats) and bee sounds were played.

To validate that the flower was the organ sensing the vibration of the pollinator, an experiment was run where the flowers were covered with a glass jar, while the rest of the plant was exposed. Sugar concentration of nectar showed no significant difference before and after the low frequency sound was played. If petals act like the ears of the plant, then there must be natural selection on the mechanical parameters of the flower. Its resonance frequency depends on size, shape and density. When comparing the traits of plants based on their pollinators, there is a pattern between the shapes of flowers with "noisy" pollinators. Bees, birds and butterflies – the flowers they pollinate all correspond to having bowl-shaped/tubular flowers.

== Sound generation ==
Plants emit audio acoustic emissions between 10–240 Hz as well as ultrasonic acoustic emissions (UAE) within 20–300 kHz. Evidence for plant mechanosensory abilities are shown when roots are subjected to unidirectional 220 Hz sound and subsequently grow in the direction of the vibration source. Using electrograph vibrational detection, structured sound wave emissions were detected along the elongation zone of root tips of corn plants in the form of loud and frequent clicks. When plants are isolated from contact, chemical, and light signal exchange with neighboring plants they are still able to sense their neighbors and detect relatives through alternative mechanisms, among which sound vibrations could play an important role. Furthermore, ultrasonic acoustic emissions (UAE) have been detected in a range of different plants which result from collapsing water columns under high tension. UAE studies show different frequencies of sound emissions based on whether or not drought conditions are present. Whether or not UAE are used by plants as a communication mechanism is not known.

Myosin in a lateral root of Arabidopsis

Although the explicit mechanisms through which sound emissions are created and detected in plants are not known, there are theories which shed light on possible mechanisms. Mechanical vibrations caused by charged cell membranes and walls is a leading hypothesis for acoustic emission generation. Myosins and other mechanochemical enzymes which use chemical energy in the form of ATP to produce mechanical vibrations in cells may also contribute to sound wave generation in plant cells. These mechanisms may lead to overall nanomechanical oscillations of cytoskeletal components, which can generate both low and high frequency vibrations.

== See also ==
- Rapid plant movement
- Plant perception (physiology)
