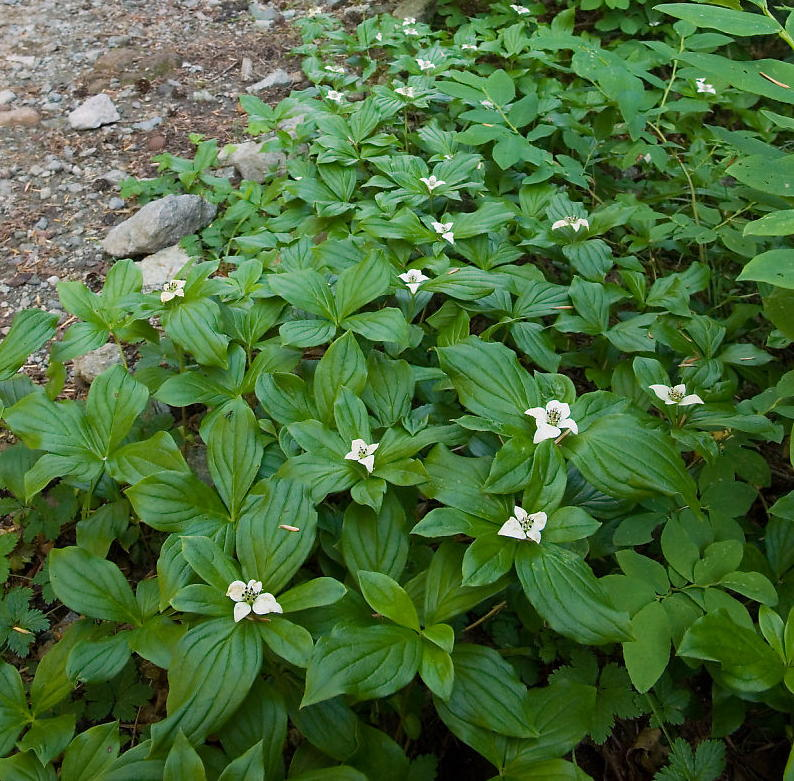
- Growing at Elfin Lakes, British Columbia

Conservation status
- Secure (NatureServe)

Scientific classification
- Kingdom: Plantae
- Clade: Tracheophytes
- Clade: Angiosperms
- Clade: Eudicots
- Clade: Asterids
- Order: Cornales
- Family: Cornaceae
- Genus: Cornus
- Subgenus: Cornus subg. Arctocrania
- Species: C. canadensis

Binomial name
- Cornus canadensis L.
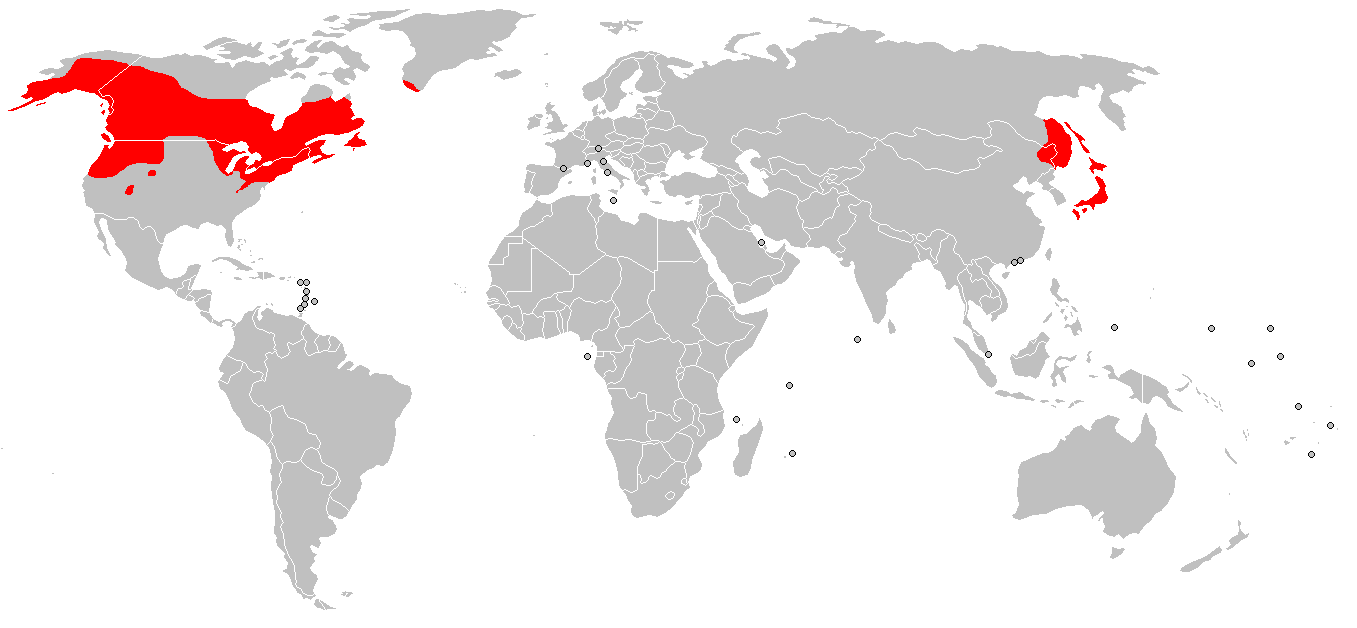

= Cornus canadensis =

Species of flowering plant

Cornus canadensis is a species of flowering plant in the dogwood family Cornaceae, native to eastern Asia and North America. Common names include Canadian dwarf cornel, Canadian bunchberry, quatre-temps, crackerberry, and creeping dogwood. It is a creeping, rhizomatous perennial growing to about 20 centimetres (8 inches) tall.

== Description ==
Cornus canadensis is a slow-growing herbaceous perennial growing 10–20 centimetres (4–8 inches) tall, generally forming a carpet-like mat. The above-ground shoots rise from slender creeping rhizomes that are 2.5–7.5 cm (1–3 in) deep in the soil and form clonal colonies under trees. The vertically produced above-ground stems are slender and unbranched.

The shiny dark green leaves are produced near the terminal node and attached via petioles 2 to 3 millimetres (1/16 to 1/8 in) in length. They are arranged oppositely on the stem, clustered with six leaves that often seem to be in a whorl because the internodes are compressed. There are two larger and four smaller leaves, the smaller ones developing from the axillary buds of the larger leaves. They are 3.5 to 7 cm (1 1/2 to 3 in) long and 1.5 to 2.5 cm (1/2 to 1 in) wide, with 2–3 veins, cuneate shaped bases and abruptly acuminate apexes. The leaf blades are obovate, with entire margins. In autumn, the leaves have red-tinted veins and turn completely red.

=== Flowers ===
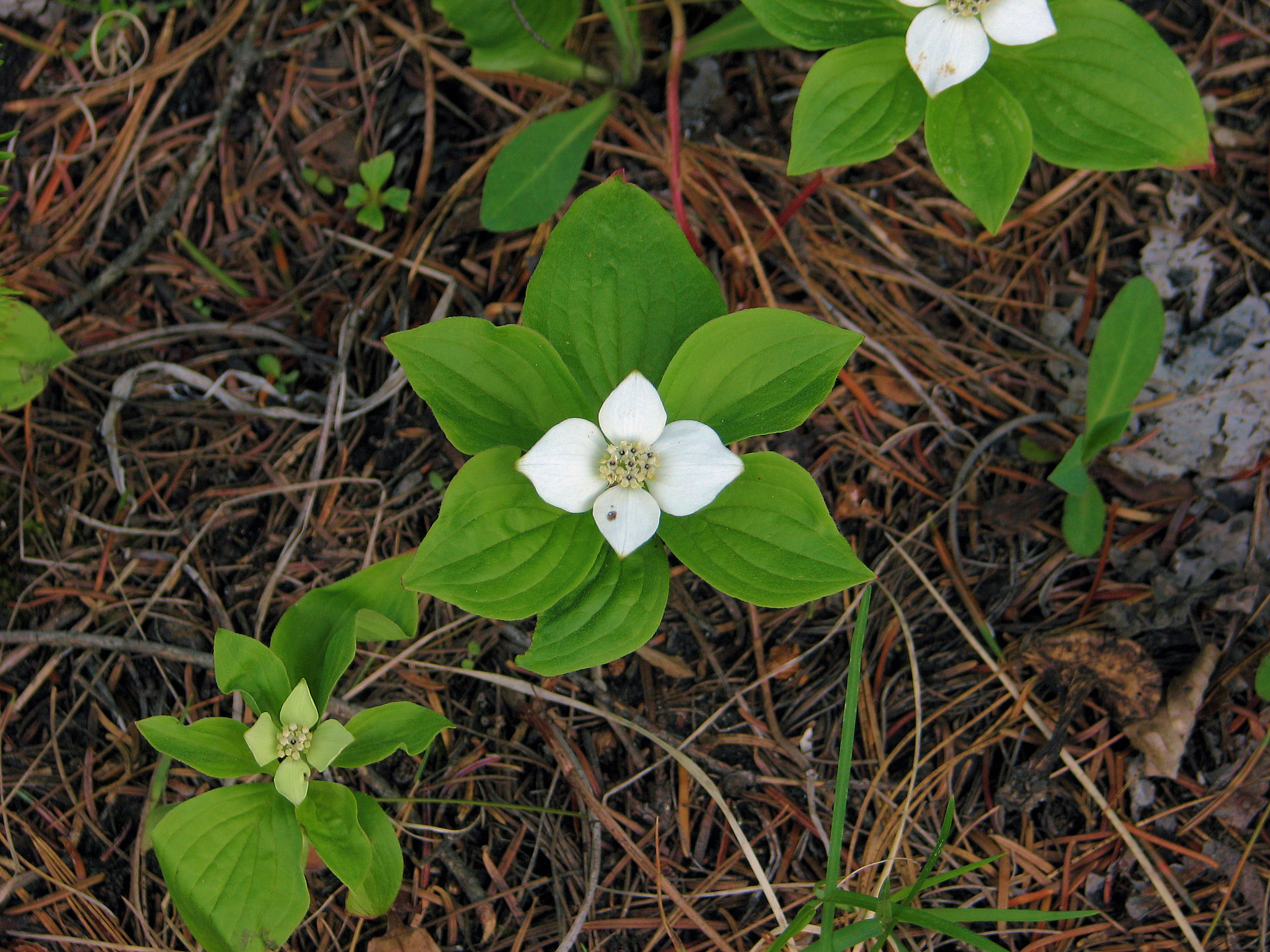
Mature and immature flowers, Bonnechere Provincial Park, Ontario

In late spring to midsummer, white flowers are produced that are 2 cm (3/4 in) in diameter with reflexed petals that are ovate-lanceolate in shape and 1–2 cm (3/8–3/4 in) long. The inflorescences are made up of compound terminal cymes, with large showy white bracts that resemble petals. The bracts are green when immature. The bracts are broadly ovate and 0.8 to 1.2 cm (3/8 to 1/2 in) long and 0.5 to 1.1 cm (1/4 to 3/8 in) wide, with seven parallel running veins. The lower nodes on the stem have greatly reduced rudimentary leaves. The calyx tube is obovate in shape and 1 mm long, covered with densely pubescent hairs along with grayish white appressed trichomes. Stamens are very short, being 1 mm long. The anthers are yellowish white in color, narrowly ovoid in shape. The styles are 1 mm long and glabrous. Plants are for the most part self-sterile and dependent on pollinators for sexual reproduction. Pollinators include bumblebees, solitary bees, beeflies, and syrphid flies. The fruits look like berries but are drupes.

=== Pollen release ===
Each flower has highly elastic petals that flip backward, releasing springy filaments that are cocked underneath the petals. The filaments snap upward flinging pollen out of containers hinged to the filaments. The stamens accelerate at a rate of 24,000 m/s^{2}. The motion, which can be triggered by pollinators, takes place in less than half a millisecond. The bunchberry has one of the fastest plant actions found so far requiring a camera capable of shooting 10,000 frames per second to catch the action.

=== Fruit ===
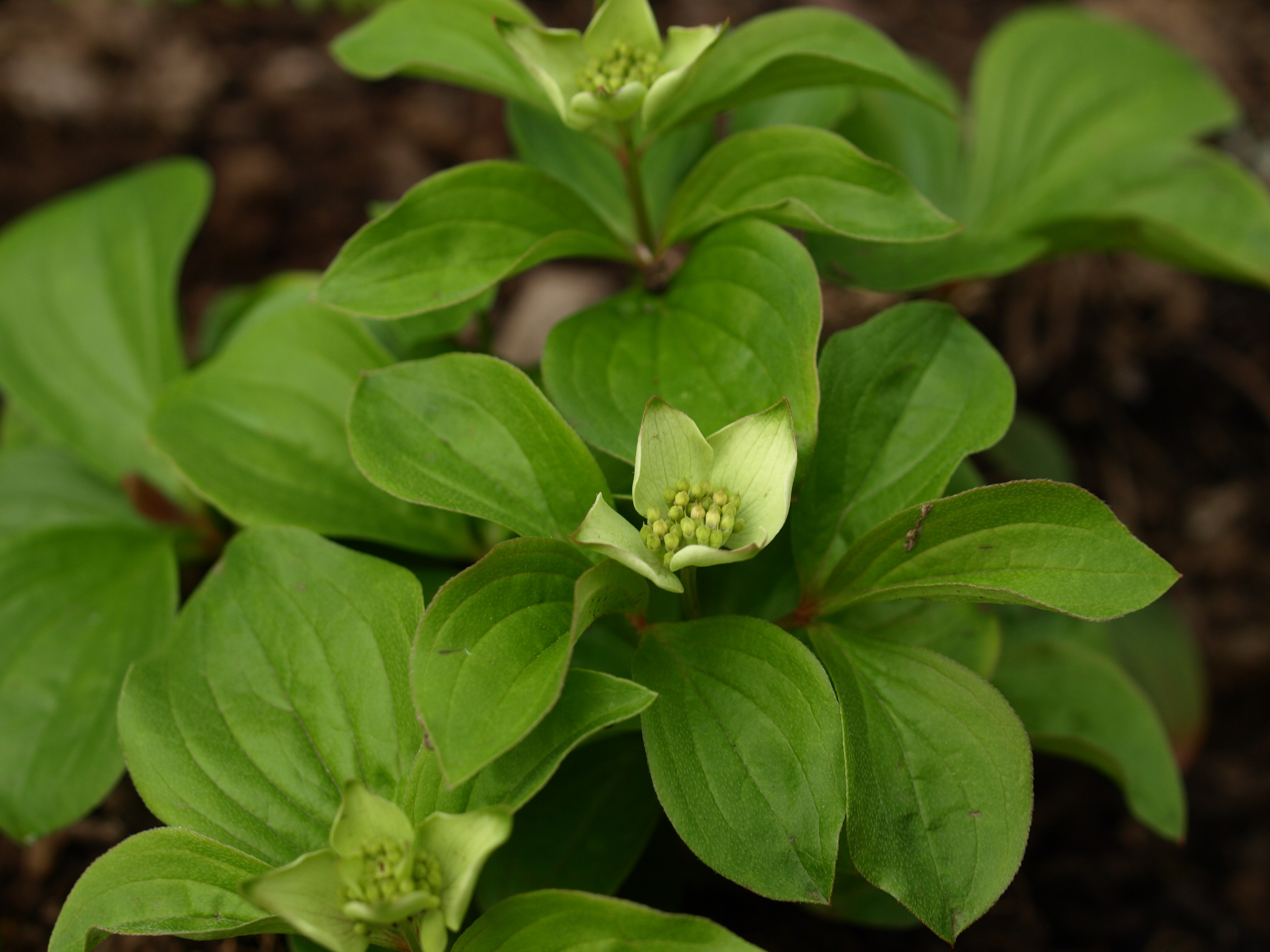
Immature flowers

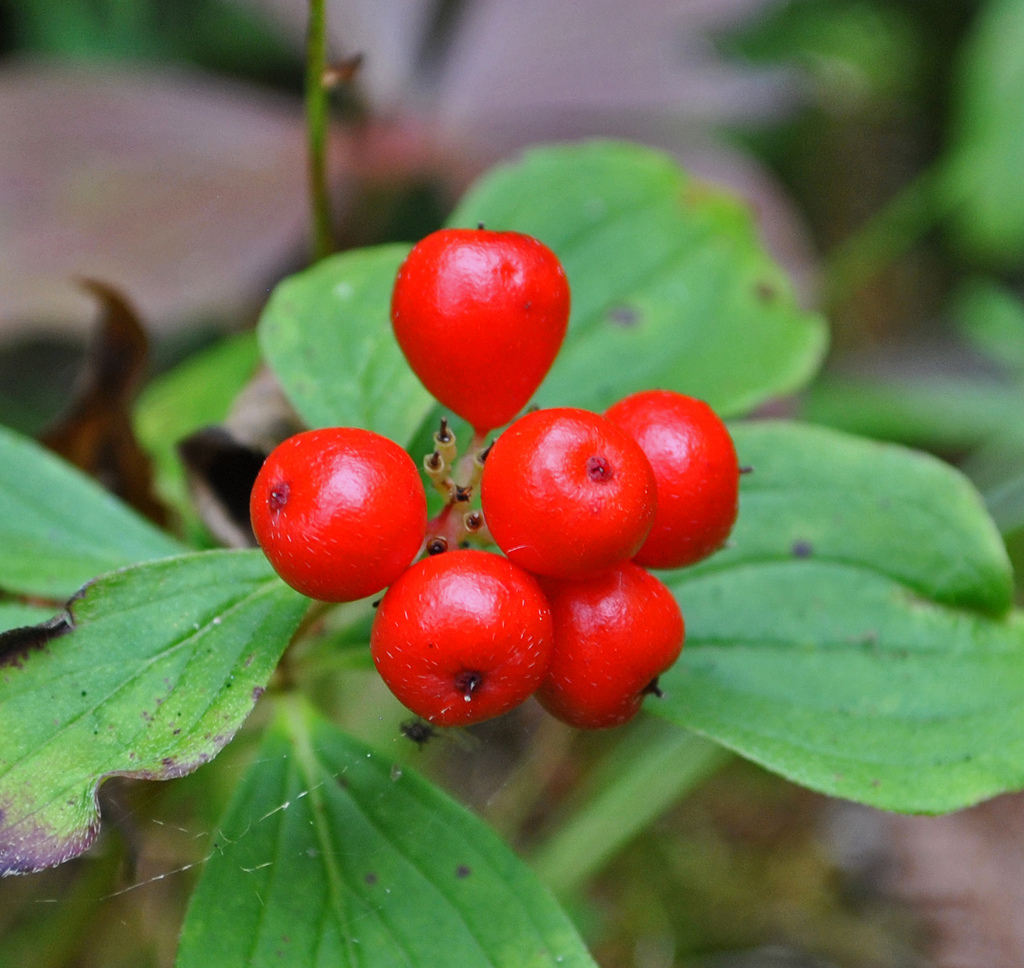
Fruit

The drupes are green, globose in shape, turning bright red at maturity in late summer; each fruit is 5 mm in diameter and contains typically one or two ellipsoid-ovoid shaped stones. The fruits come into season in late summer. The large seeds within are somewhat hard and crunchy.

=== Similar species ===
Cornus glabrata also has opposite leaves.

== Taxonomy ==
While distinctive as a species itself, the generic placement of these plants has differed in various botanical treatments. When the genus Cornus is taken broadly, as done here, this species is Cornus canadensis, and is included in the subgenus Arctocrania. However, if Cornus is treated in a narrower sense, excluding this species, it can instead be classified as Chamaepericlymenum canadense or as Cornella canadensis.

Where C. canadensis, a forest species, and Cornus suecica, a bog species, grow near each other in their overlapping ranges in Alaska, Labrador, and Greenland, they can hybridize by cross-pollination, producing plants with intermediate characteristics.

== Distribution and habitat ==
Its native distribution includes Japan, North Korea, northeastern China (Jilin Province), the Russian Far East, the northern United States, Colorado, New Mexico, Canada and Greenland.

Cornus canadensis is a mesophytic species that needs cool, moist soils. It inhabits montane and boreal coniferous forests, where it is found growing along the margins of moist woods, on old tree stumps, in mossy areas, and among other open and moist habitats.

== Ecology ==
Birds are the main dispersal agents of the seeds, feeding on the fruit during their fall migration. In Alaska, bunchberry is an important forage plant for mule deer, black-tailed deer and moose, which eat it throughout the growing season. In addition to pollinating species, C. canadensis is a host of numerous leaf-mining insects and a gall-forming midge.

== Uses ==
It is used as ornamental groundcover in gardens. It prefers moist acidic soil. The wildflower author Claude A. Barr was of the opinion that the crimson berries are even more attractive than the flowers.

The fruits are edible raw but have little flavor. The pulp does not easily separate from the seeds. The berries can be cooked, strained, and combined with other fruits or used for pudding.

== In culture ==
Claire Waight Keller included the plant to represent Canada in Meghan Markle's wedding veil, which included the distinctive flora of each Commonwealth country. Although not officially named, Cornus canadensis is considered by the Master Gardners of Ontario to be Canada's national flower.

== Gallery ==
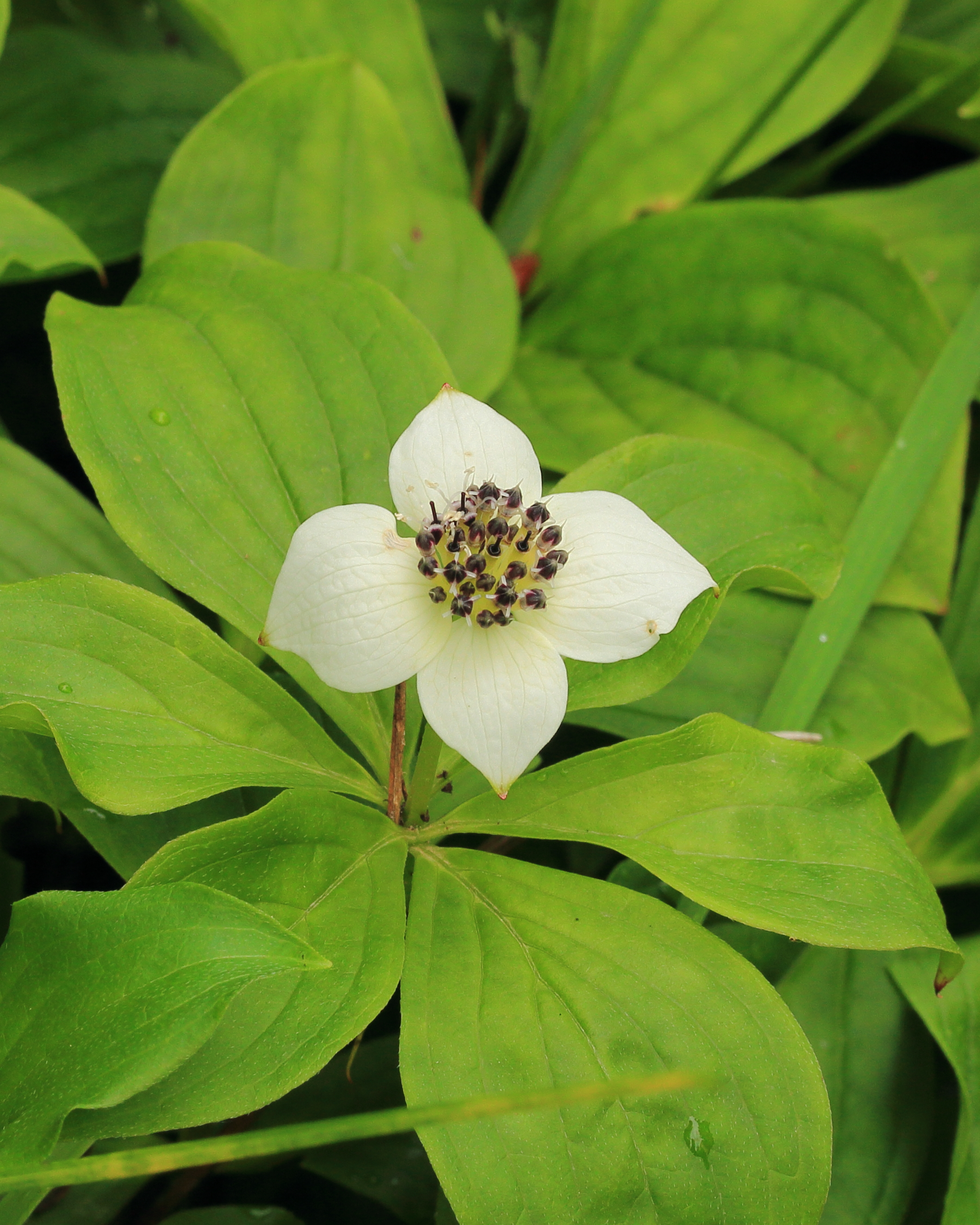
Flower and leaves

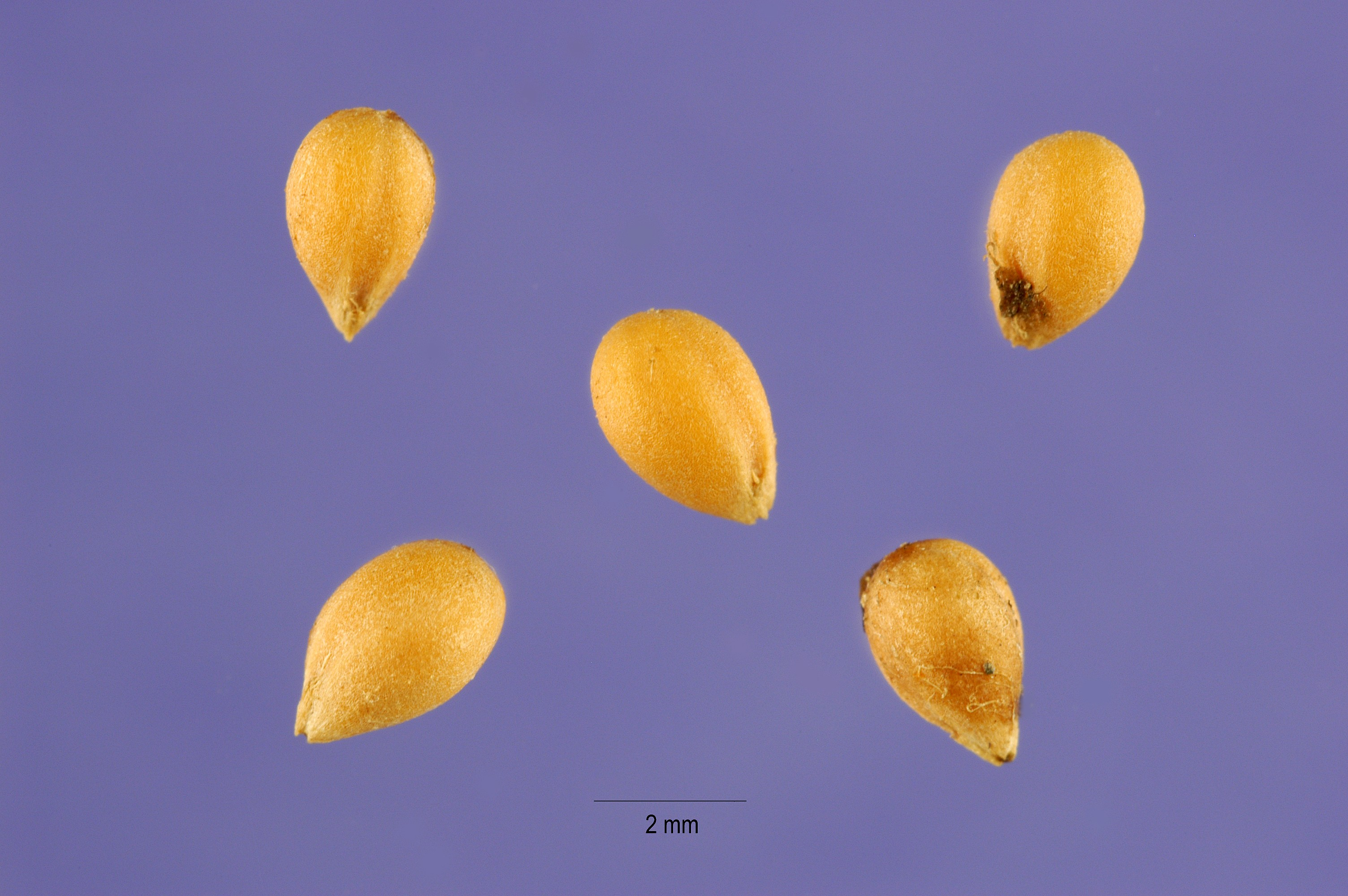
Seeds

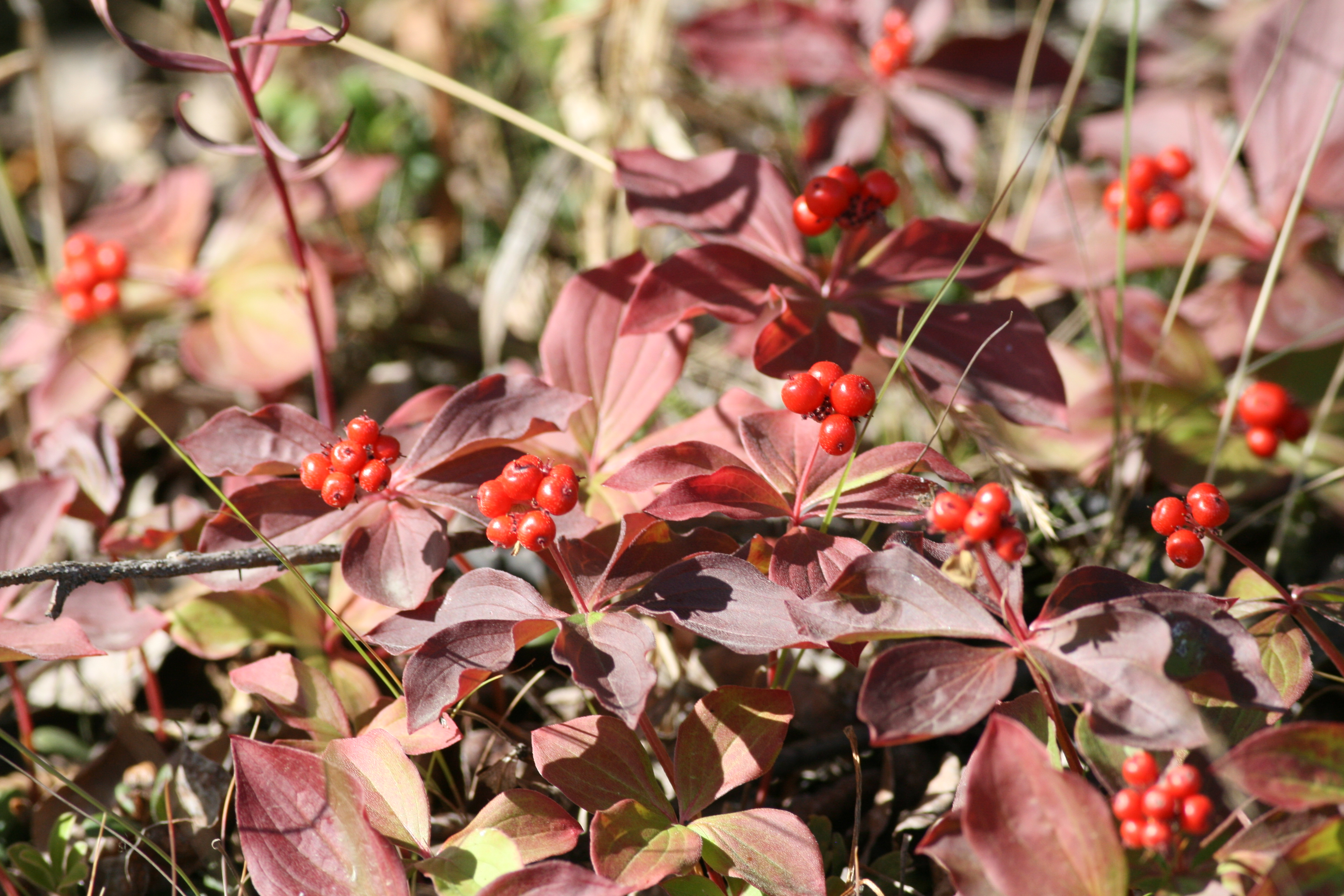
Dwarf plant

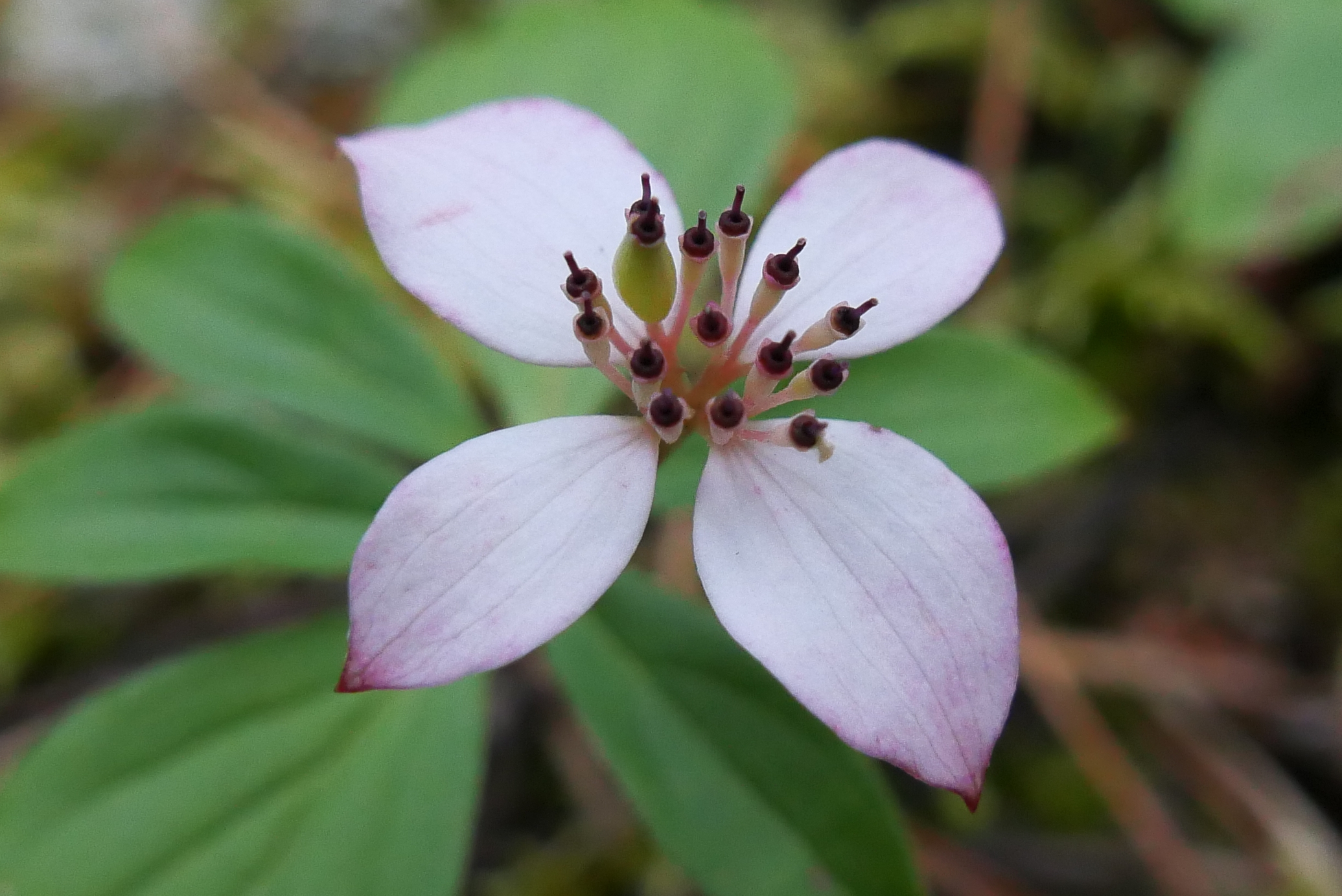
Mature flower

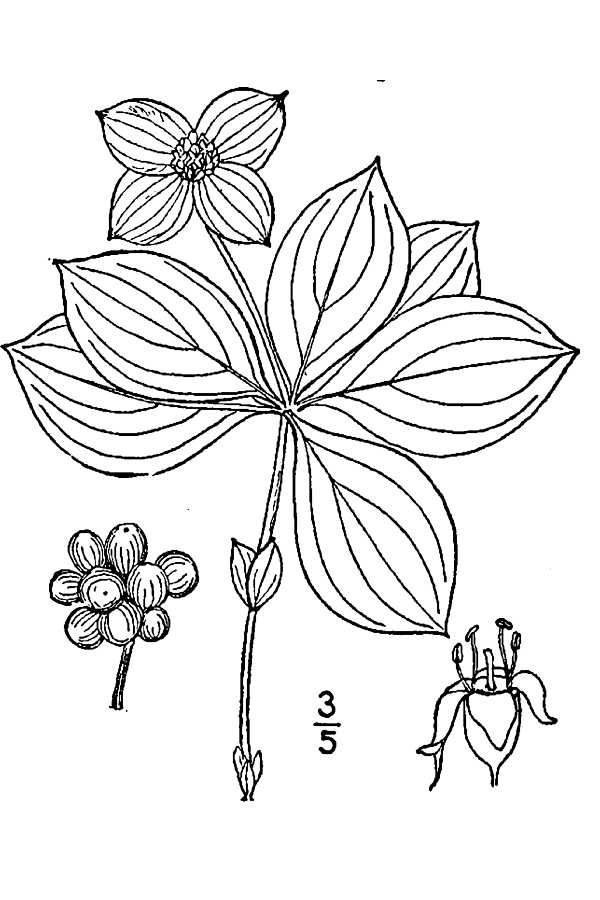
Drawing

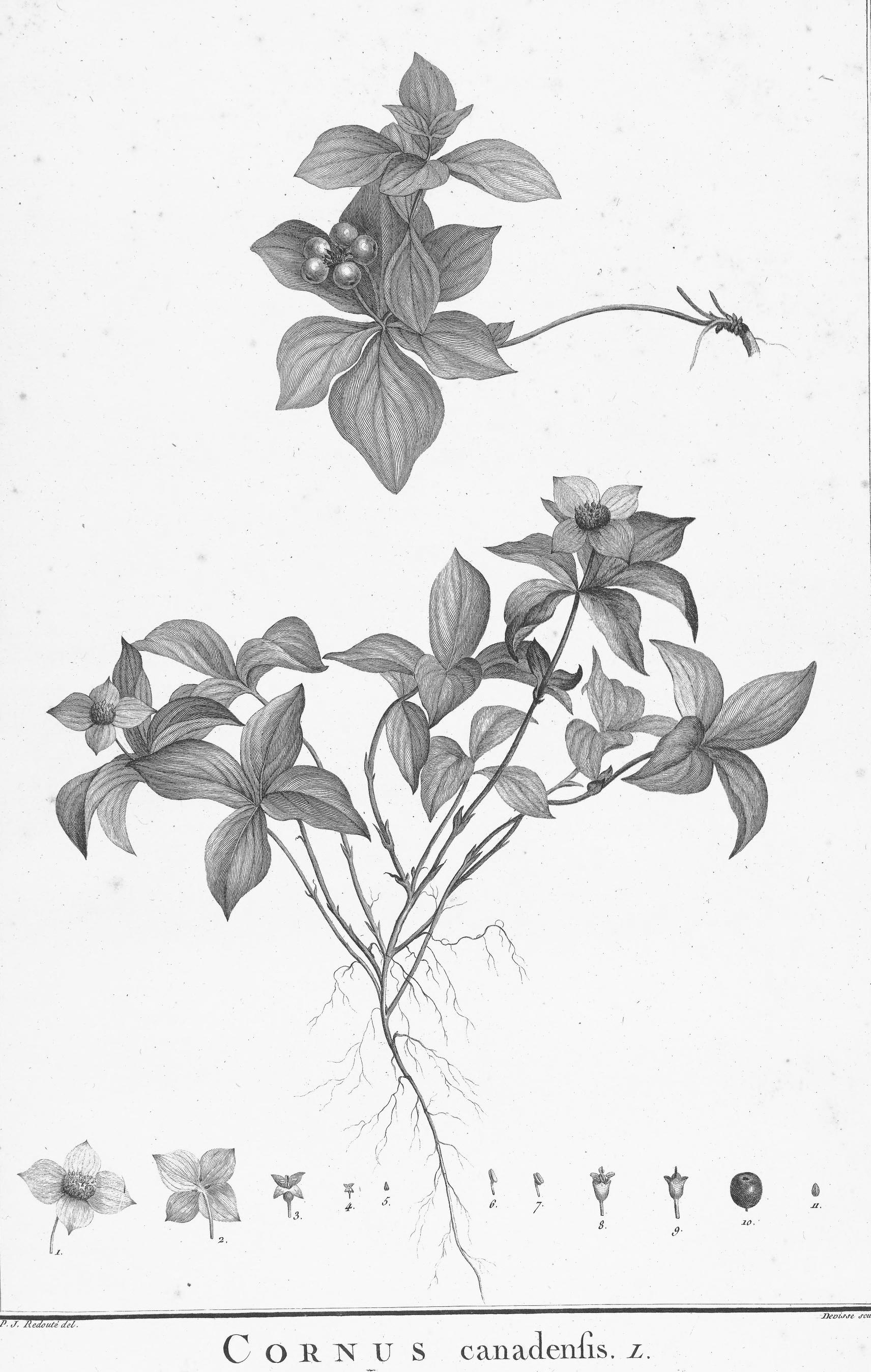
Drawing

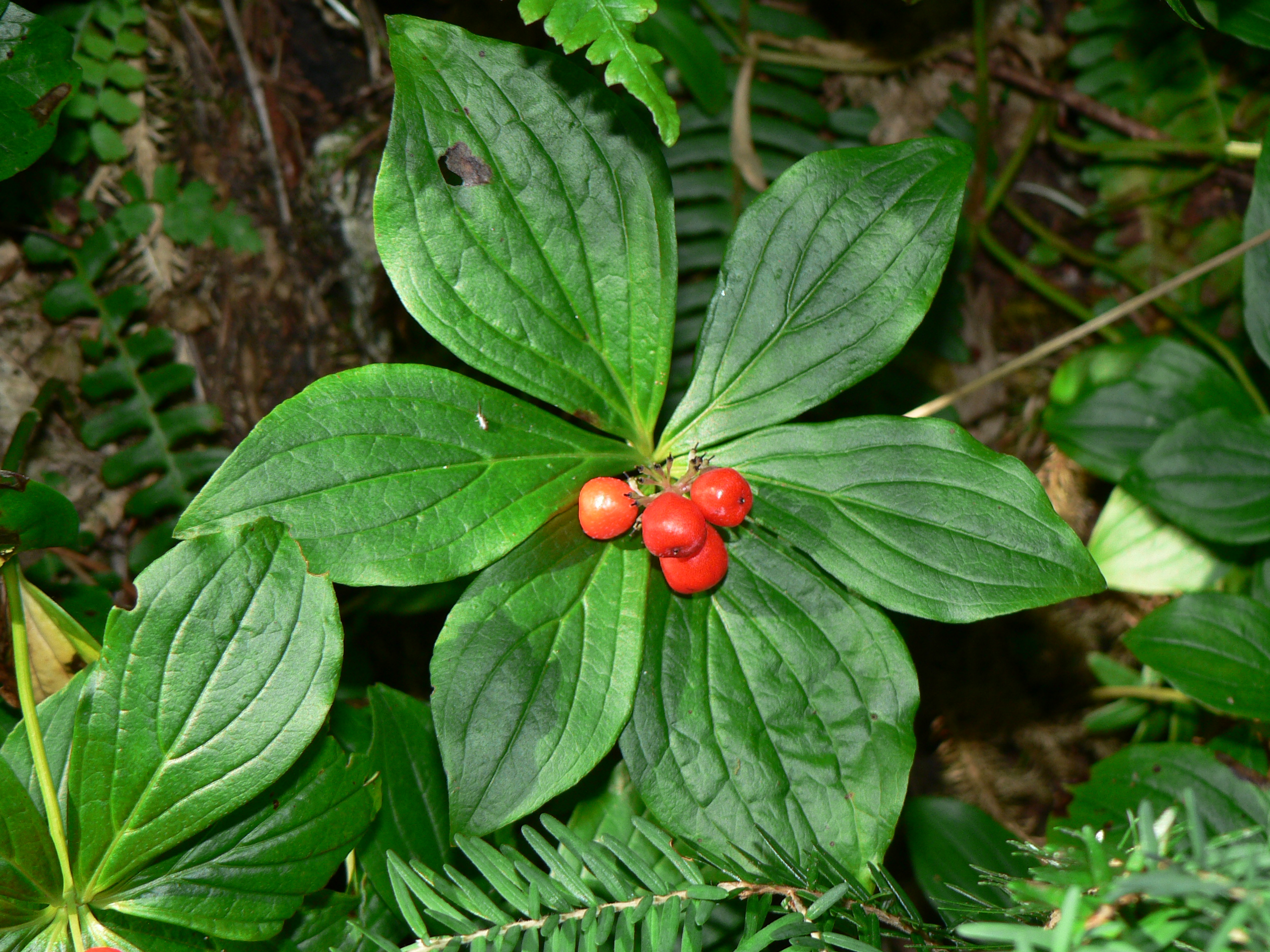
Cornus x unalaschkensis
