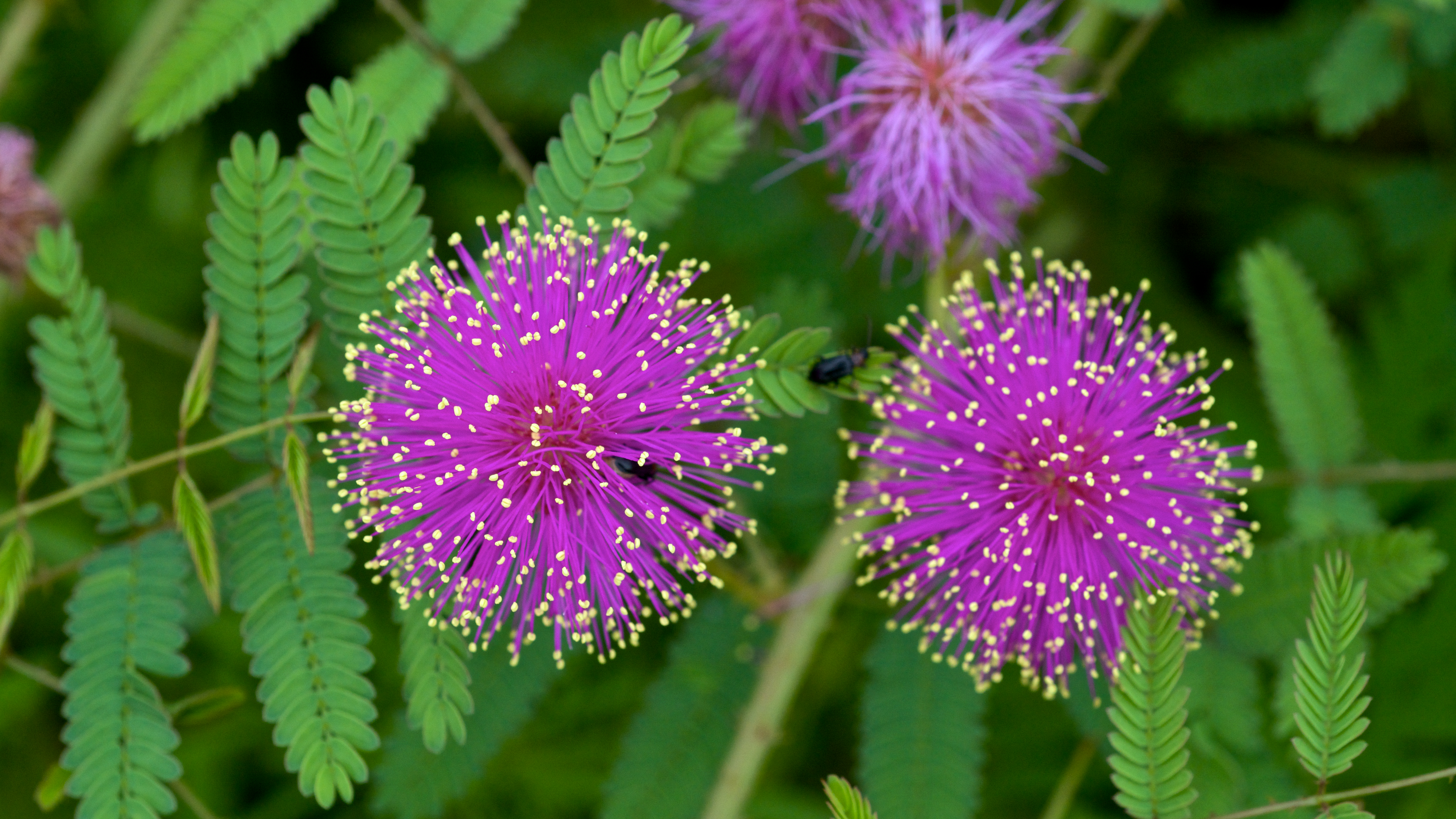
- Flowers and foliage

Scientific classification
- Kingdom: Plantae
- Clade: Tracheophytes
- Clade: Angiosperms
- Clade: Eudicots
- Clade: Rosids
- Order: Fabales
- Family: Fabaceae
- Subfamily: Caesalpinioideae
- Clade: Mimosoid clade
- Genus: Mimosa
- Species: M. nuttallii

Binomial name
- Mimosa nuttallii (DC.) B.L. Turner

= Mimosa nuttallii =

Species of plant

Mimosa nuttallii, the Nuttall's sensitive-briar, catclaw brier, or sensitive brier, is an herbaceous perennial legume in the subfamily Mimosoideae native to the central United States. It has a trailing semi-woody vine covered with small recurved prickles that can be painful to bare skin.

The ribbed stems of this plant usually grow to 4 ft (1.2 m) or more and are branched. Plants rarely reach more than 1–2 ft (0.3–0.6 m) in height. The frond-like leaves are alternate with prickly stalks. The bipinnate leaf blades are divided into four to nine pairs of small segments, and these are again divided into 8–15 pairs of tiny leaflets. Leaflets are elliptic and glabrous with a prominent midrib.

Like a few other species of Mimosa (such as M. pudica), the leaves exhibit nyctinastic movement, folding up quickly when touched or disturbed. It is also said that the roots of M. nuttallii give off an acrid, garlic-like smell when disturbed. This may be an additional defense mechanism of the plant.

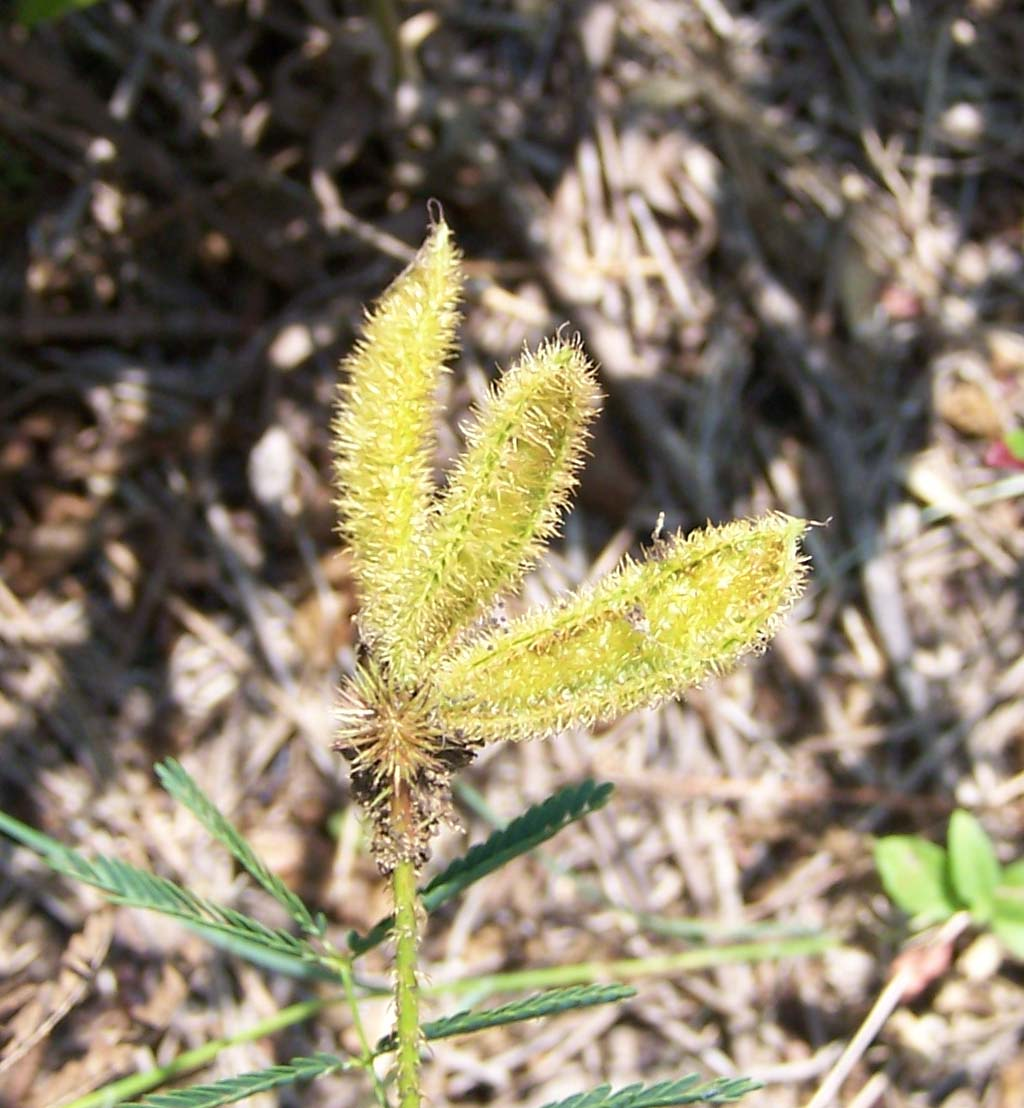
Seed pods

The tiny flowers occur in congested bunches. Before they open, they look much like small green bramble fruits. Each individual flower has five minute petals and eight to ten conspicuous stamens. When open, the pink-purple stamens form a globelike cluster at the tip of their leafless stalk. Yellow pollen can often be seen highlighting the tips. The globes are about 0.5–0.75 in (13–19 mm) across. Flowers and fruits appear from May to September. The fruit of the catclaw brier is a long, slender, rounded pod that has a covering of dense prickles, typically about 1–3 in (25–76 mm) long.

Habitat includes disturbed areas of sandy or silty soils, roadsides, grasslands, prairies and forest margins. It is known to be very nutritious for livestock, who will seek it out. On rangeland, its absence can also be a good indicator of overgrazing.

Other common names for this plant include Nuttall's sensitive briar and shame-boy, a reference to the sensitive foliage that closes upon touch. Former synonyms include Schrankia nuttallii. The species name nuttallii is in honor of Thomas Nuttall, an English botanist who lived in the United States for many years.
