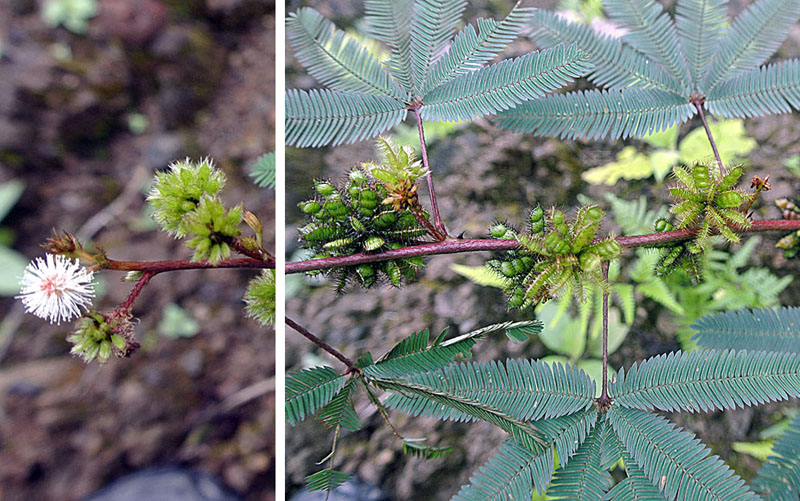

Scientific classification
- Kingdom: Plantae
- Clade: Embryophytes
- Clade: Tracheophytes
- Clade: Spermatophytes
- Clade: Angiosperms
- Clade: Eudicots
- Clade: Rosids
- Order: Fabales
- Family: Fabaceae
- Subfamily: Caesalpinioideae
- Clade: Mimosoid clade
- Genus: Mimosa
- Species: M. polydactyla

Binomial name
- Mimosa polydactyla Bonpl.

Synonyms
- Mimosa glockeri Meisn. ex Benth.; Mimosa hexaphylla Salzm. ex Benth.

= Mimosa polydactyla =

Species of flowering plant

Mimosa polydactyla is a species of perennial shrub, in the mimosoid clade of the family Fabaceae. It is native to a region that stretches from Southern Mexico to Southern tropical America.

It is used in medicine.
