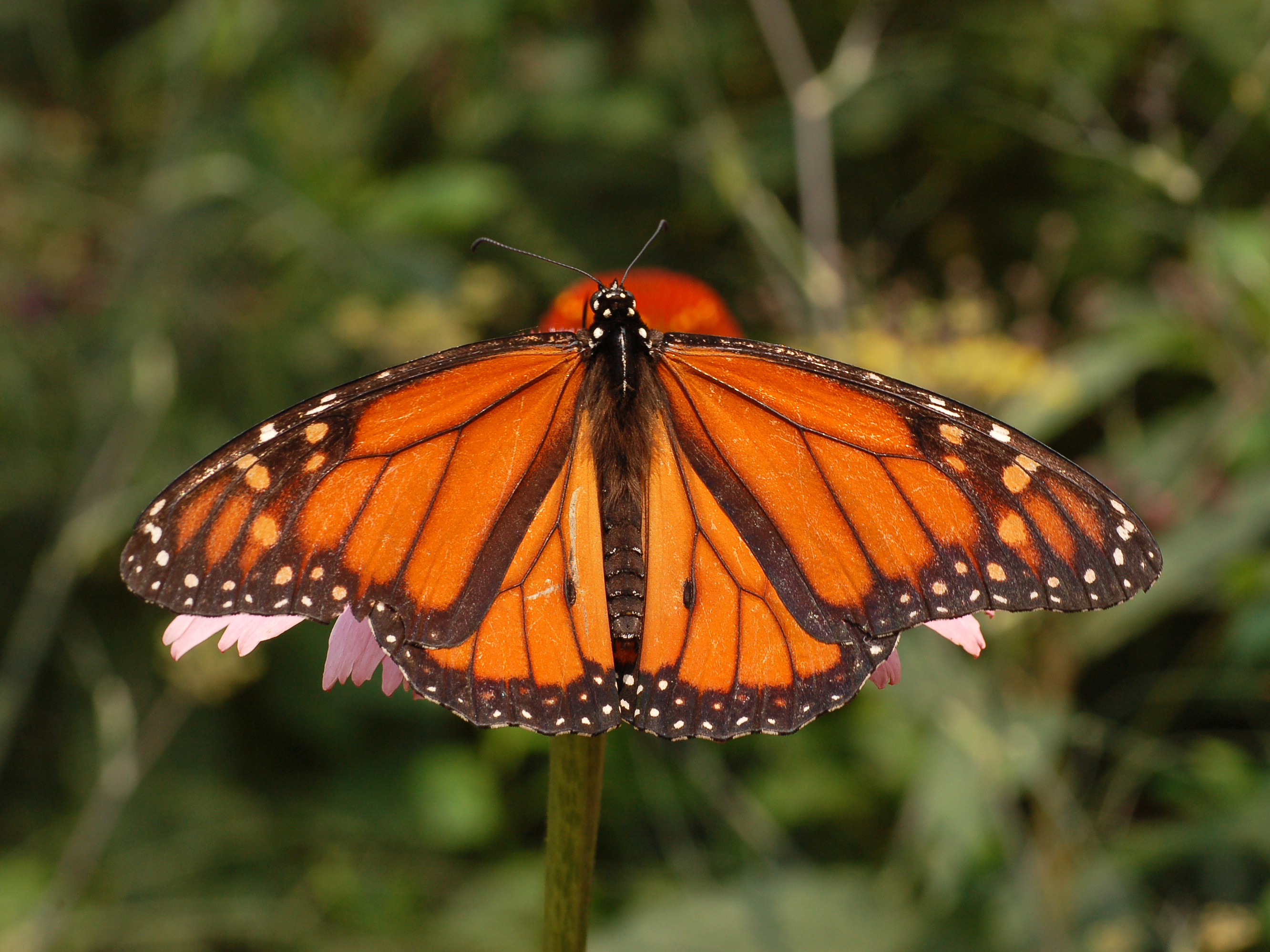
- Male
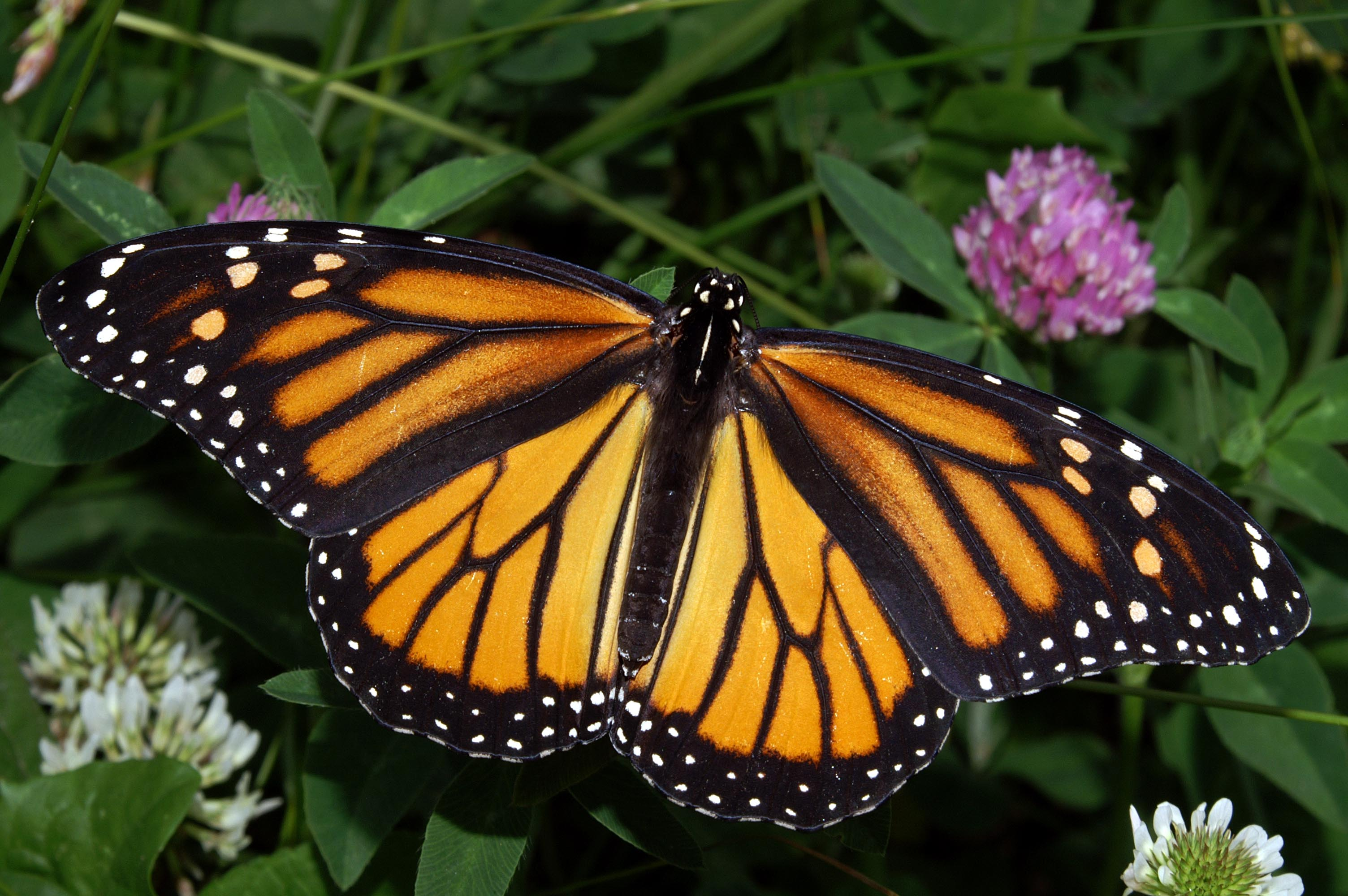
- Female

Conservation status
- Least Concern (IUCN 3.1) (entire species)

- Vulnerable (IUCN 3.1) (migratory subspecies)

Scientific classification
- Kingdom: Animalia
- Phylum: Arthropoda
- Clade: Pancrustacea
- Class: Insecta
- Order: Lepidoptera
- Family: Nymphalidae
- Genus: Danaus
- Species: D. plexippus

Binomial name
- Danaus plexippus (Linnaeus, 1758)
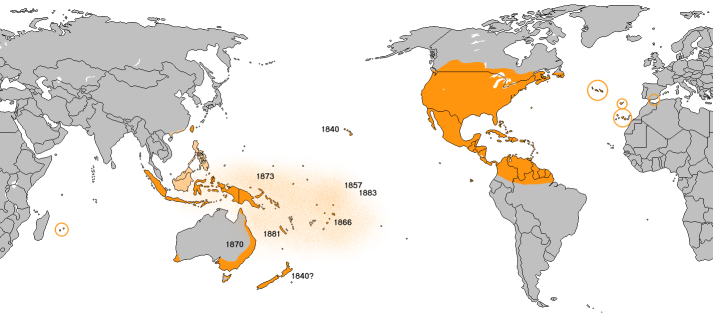

Synonyms
- Papilio plexippus Linnaeus, 1758; Danaus archippus (Fabricius, 1793); Danaus menippe (Hübner, 1816); Anosia plexippus (Moore, 1883)

= Monarch butterfly =

Milkweed butterfly in the family Nymphalidae

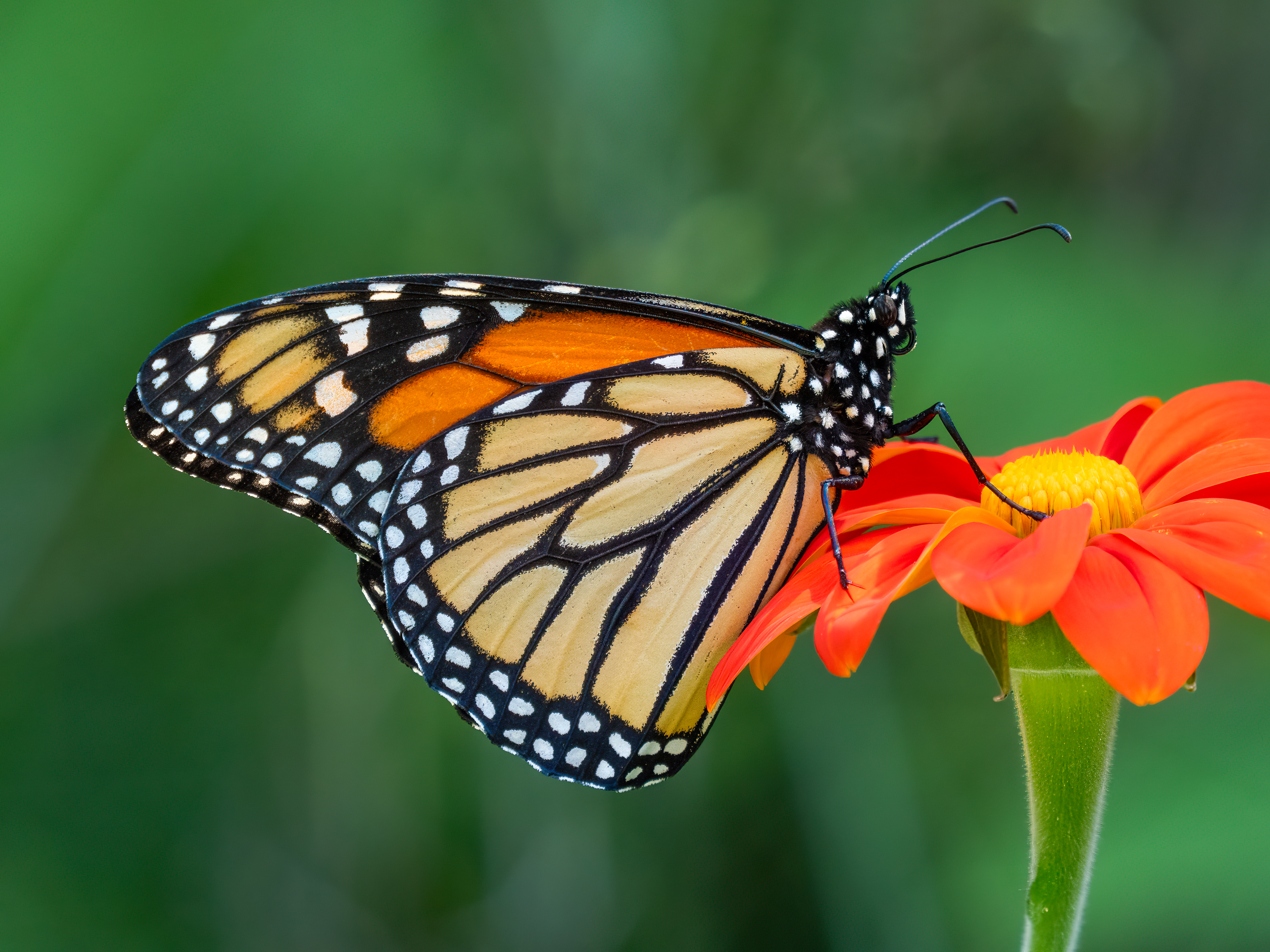
Male D. p. plexippus on Tithonia flower

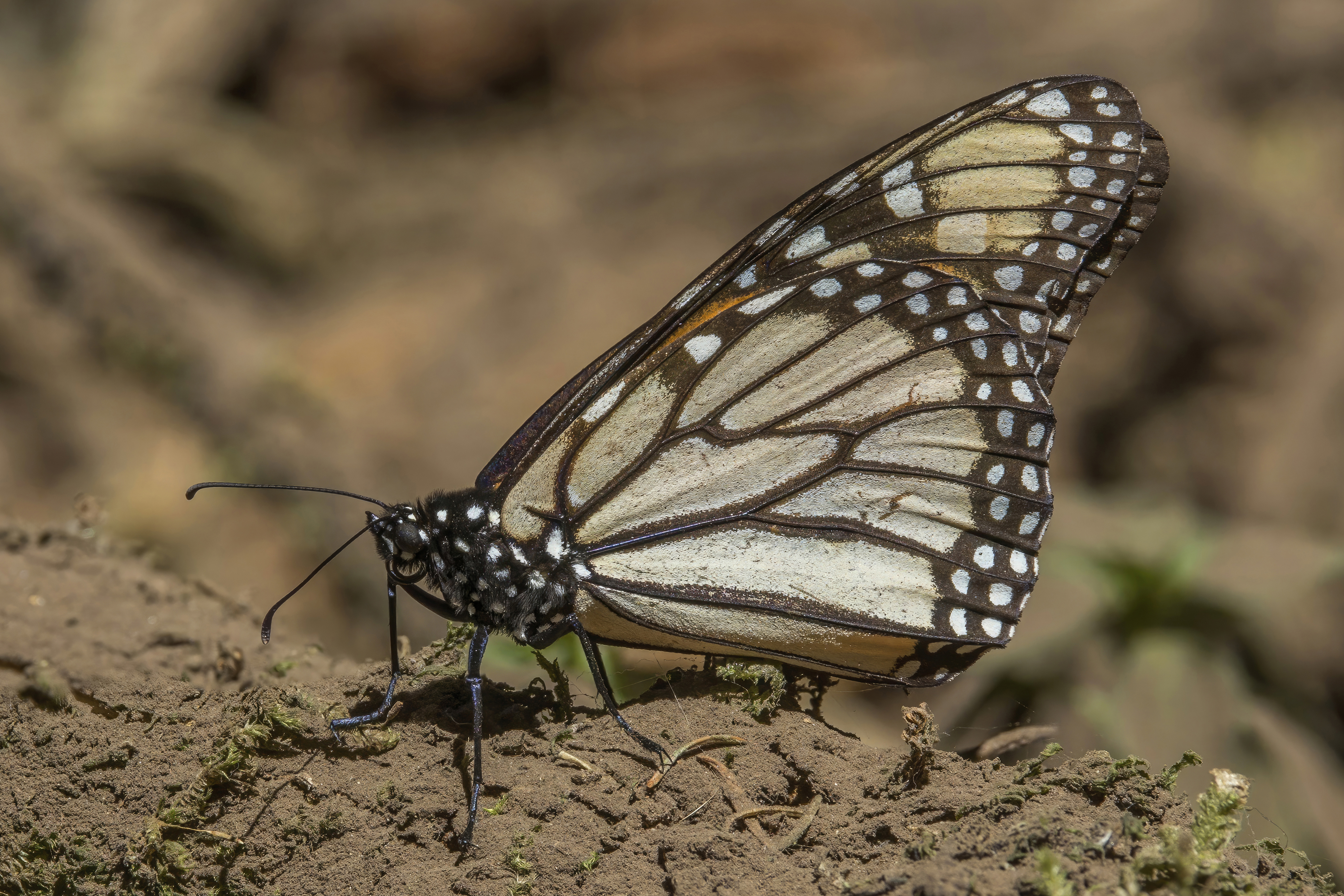
D. p. plexippus Piedra Herrada, Mexico

The monarch butterfly or simply monarch (Danaus plexippus) is a milkweed butterfly (subfamily Danainae) in the family Nymphalidae. Other common names, depending on region, include milkweed, common tiger, wanderer, and black-veined brown. It is among the most familiar of North American butterflies and an iconic pollinator, although it is not an especially effective pollinator of milkweeds. Its wings feature an easily recognizable black, orange, and white pattern, with a wingspan of 8.9–10.2 cm (3.5–4.0 in). A Müllerian mimic, the viceroy butterfly, is similar in color and pattern, but is markedly smaller and has an extra black stripe across each hindwing.

The eastern North American monarch population is notable for its annual southward late-summer/autumn instinctive migration from the northern and central United States and southern Canada to Florida and Mexico. During the fall migration, monarchs cover thousands of miles, with a corresponding multigenerational return north in spring. The western North American population of monarchs west of the Rocky Mountains often migrates to sites in southern California, but have been found in overwintering Mexican sites, as well. Populations are found further south in the Americas, and in parts of Europe, Oceania, and Southeast Asia.

== Etymology ==
The species was originally described by Carl Linnaeus in his Systema Naturae of 1758 and placed in the genus Papilio. In 1780, Jan Krzysztof Kluk used the monarch as the type species for a new genus, Danaus. However, many works published between at least 1883 and 1964 identified the species as Anosia plexippus or Anosia archippus.

In 1874, entomologist Samuel Hubbard Scudder suggested naming the butterfly "The Monarch". He cited its large size and the notion that it "rules a vast domain" as the basis for the name, which he preferred to William D'Urban's "Storm Fritillary" and Philip Henry Gosse's "Archippus".

In 2005, investigators reported that the monophyletic genus Danaus s.l. had previously been divided into three subgenera (Danaus s. s., Salatura, and Anosia). However, based on their own studies, which combined mitochondrial DNA and nuclear DNA sequence information with morphological data, they concluded that the earlier classification was unsustainable and should be abandoned.

Danaus (Ancient Greek Δαναός), a great-grandson of Zeus, was a mythical king in Egypt or Libya, who founded Argos; Plexippus (Πλήξιππος) was one of the 50 sons of Aegyptus, the twin brother of Danaus. In Homeric Greek, his name means 'one who urges on horses', i.e., 'rider' or 'charioteer'. In the tenth edition of Systema Naturae, at the bottom of page 467, Linnaeus wrote that the names of the Danai festivi, the division of the genus to which Papilio plexippus belonged, were derived from the sons of Aegyptus. Linnaeus divided his large genus Papilio, containing all known butterfly species, into what we would now call subgenera. The Danai festivi formed one of the "subgenera", containing colorful species, as opposed to the Danai candidi, containing species with bright white wings. Linnaeus wrote: "Danaorum Candidorum nomina a filiabus Danai Aegypti, Festivorum a filiis mutuatus sunt." (English: "The names of the Danai candidi have been derived from the daughters of Danaus, those of the Danai festivi from the sons of Aegyptus.").

Robert Michael Pyle suggested Danaus is a masculinized version of Danaë (Greek Δανάη), Danaus's great-great-granddaughter, to whom Zeus came as a shower of gold, which seemed to him a more appropriate source for the name of this butterfly.

== Taxonomy ==
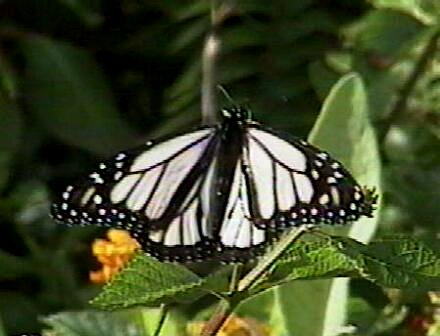
White morph of the monarch in Hawaii called the white monarch

Monarch butterfly, Ashbury, Sydney, 2023

Monarchs belong to the subfamily Danainae of the family Nymphalidae. Danainae was formerly considered a separately family Danaidae. The three species of monarch butterflies are:

- D. plexippus, described by Linnaeus in 1758, is the species known most commonly as the monarch butterfly ranging from North America to northern South America. Its range extends worldwide, including Hawaii, Australia, New Zealand, Spain, and the Pacific Islands.
- D. erippus, the southern monarch, was described by Pieter Cramer in 1775. This species is found in tropical and subtropical latitudes of South America, mainly in Brazil, Uruguay, Paraguay, Argentina, Bolivia, Chile, and southern Peru. The South American monarch and the North American monarch may have been one species at one time. Some researchers believe the southern monarch separated from the monarch's population some two million years ago, at the end of the Pliocene. Sea levels were higher, and the entire Amazonas lowland was a vast expanse of brackish swamp that offered limited butterfly habitat.
- D. cleophile, the Jamaican monarch, described by Jean-Baptiste Godart in 1819, ranges from Jamaica to Hispaniola.

Six subspecies and two color morphs of D. plexippus have been identified:

- D. p. plexippus – nominate subspecies, described by Linnaeus in 1758, is the migratory subspecies known from most of North America.
  - D. p. p. "form nivosus", the white monarch commonly found on Oahu, Hawaii, and rarely in other locations.
  - D. p. p. (as yet unnamed) – a color morph lacking some wing vein markings.
- D. p. nigrippus (Richard Haensch, 1909) – South America − as forma: Danais [sic] archippus f. nigrippus. Hay-Roe et al. in 2007 identified this taxon as a subspecies
- D. p. megalippe (Jacob Hübner, [1826]) – nonmigratory subspecies, and is found from Florida and Georgia southwards, throughout the Caribbean and Central America to the Amazon River.
- D. p. leucogyne (Arthur G. Butler, 1884) − St. Thomas
- D. p. portoricensis Austin Hobart Clark, 1941 − Puerto Rico
- D. p. tobagi Austin Hobart Clark, 1941 − Tobago

The population level of the white morph in Oahu is nearing 10%. On other Hawaiian islands, the white morph occurs at a relatively low frequency. White monarchs (D. p. p. "form nivosus") have been found throughout the world, including Australia, New Zealand, Indonesia, and the United States. However, some taxonomists disagree on these classifications.

== Genome ==
The monarch was the first butterfly to have its genome sequenced. The 273-million-base pair draft sequence includes a set of 16,866 protein-coding genes. The genome provides researchers insights into migratory behavior, the circadian clock, juvenile hormone pathways, and microRNAs that are differentially expressed between summer and migratory monarchs. More recently, the genetic basis of monarch migration and warning coloration has been described.

No genetic differentiation exists between the migratory populations of eastern and western North America. Recent research has identified the specific areas in the genome of the monarch that regulate migration. No genetic difference is seen between a migrating and nonmigrating monarch, but the gene is expressed in migrating monarchs, but not expressed in nonmigrating monarchs.

A 2015 publication identified genes from wasp bracoviruses in the genome of the North American monarch leading to articles about monarch butterflies being genetically modified organisms.

== Life cycle ==
The life cycle of the monarch butterfly

Like all Lepidoptera, monarchs undergo complete metamorphosis; their life cycle has four phases: egg, larva, pupa, and adult. Monarchs transition from eggs to adults during warm summer temperatures in as little as 25 days, extending to as many as seven weeks during cool spring conditions. During their development, both larvae and their milkweed hosts are vulnerable to weather extremes, predators, parasites, and diseases; commonly fewer than 10% of monarch eggs and caterpillars survive.

=== Egg ===
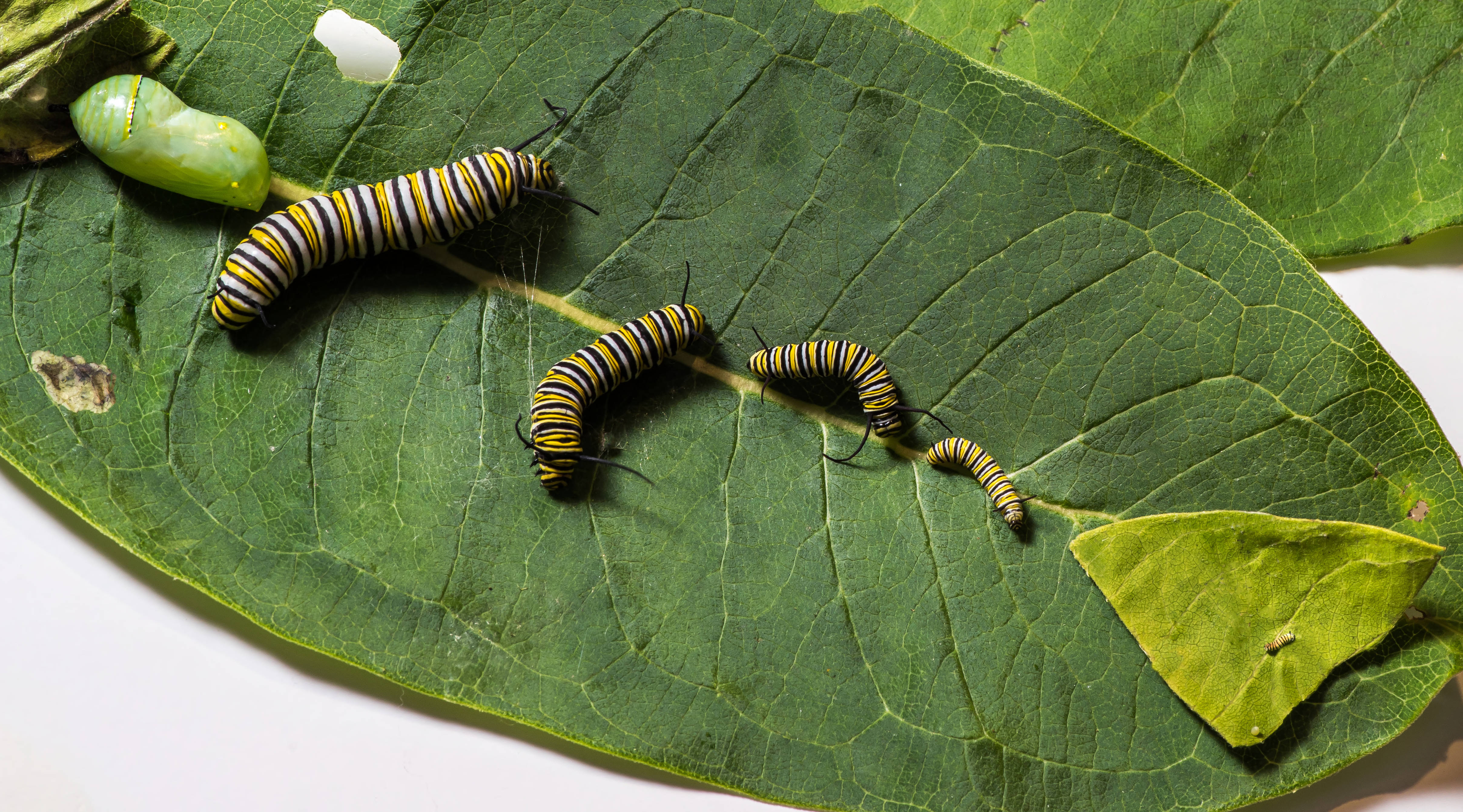
Sequential stages of monarch development − an egg, five caterpillars, and a chrysalis on common milkweed leaves

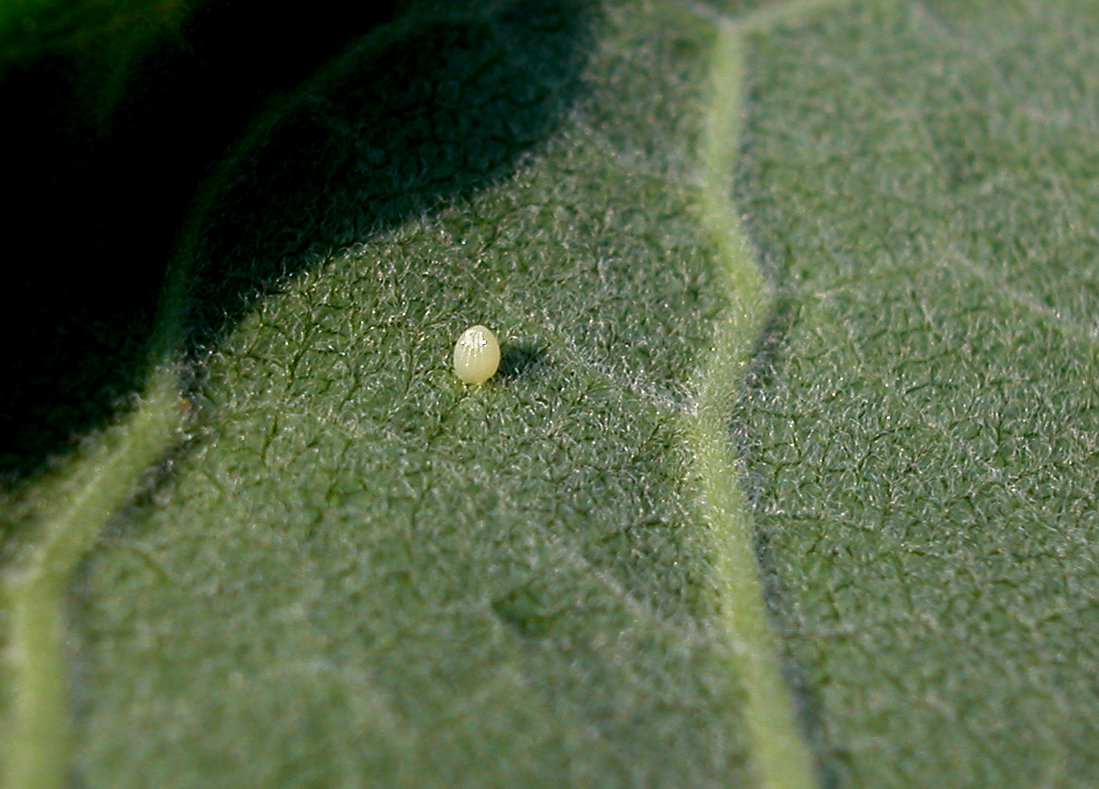
Egg

Monarch butterfly flying around narrowleaf milkweed, depositing an egg. Played a second time at half speed.

The egg is derived from materials ingested as a larva and from the spermatophores received from males during mating. Female monarchs lay eggs singly, most often on the underside of a young leaf of a milkweed plant during the spring and summer. Females secrete a small amount of glue to attach their eggs directly to the plant. They typically lay 300 to 500 eggs over a two- to five-week period.

Eggs are cream colored or light green, ovate to conical in shape, and about 1.2 mm × 0.9 mm (0.047 in × 0.035 in) in size. The eggs weigh less than 0.5 mg (0.0077 gr) each and have raised ridges that form longitudinally from the point to apex to the base. Although each egg is 1/1000 the mass of the female, she may lay up to her own mass in eggs. Females lay smaller eggs as they age. Larger females lay larger eggs.The number of eggs laid by a female, which may mate several times, can reach 1,180.

Eggs take three to eight days to develop and hatch into larvae or caterpillars. The offspring's consumption of milkweed benefits health and helps defend them against predators. In the U.S. Monarchs lay eggs along the southern migration route.

=== Larva ===
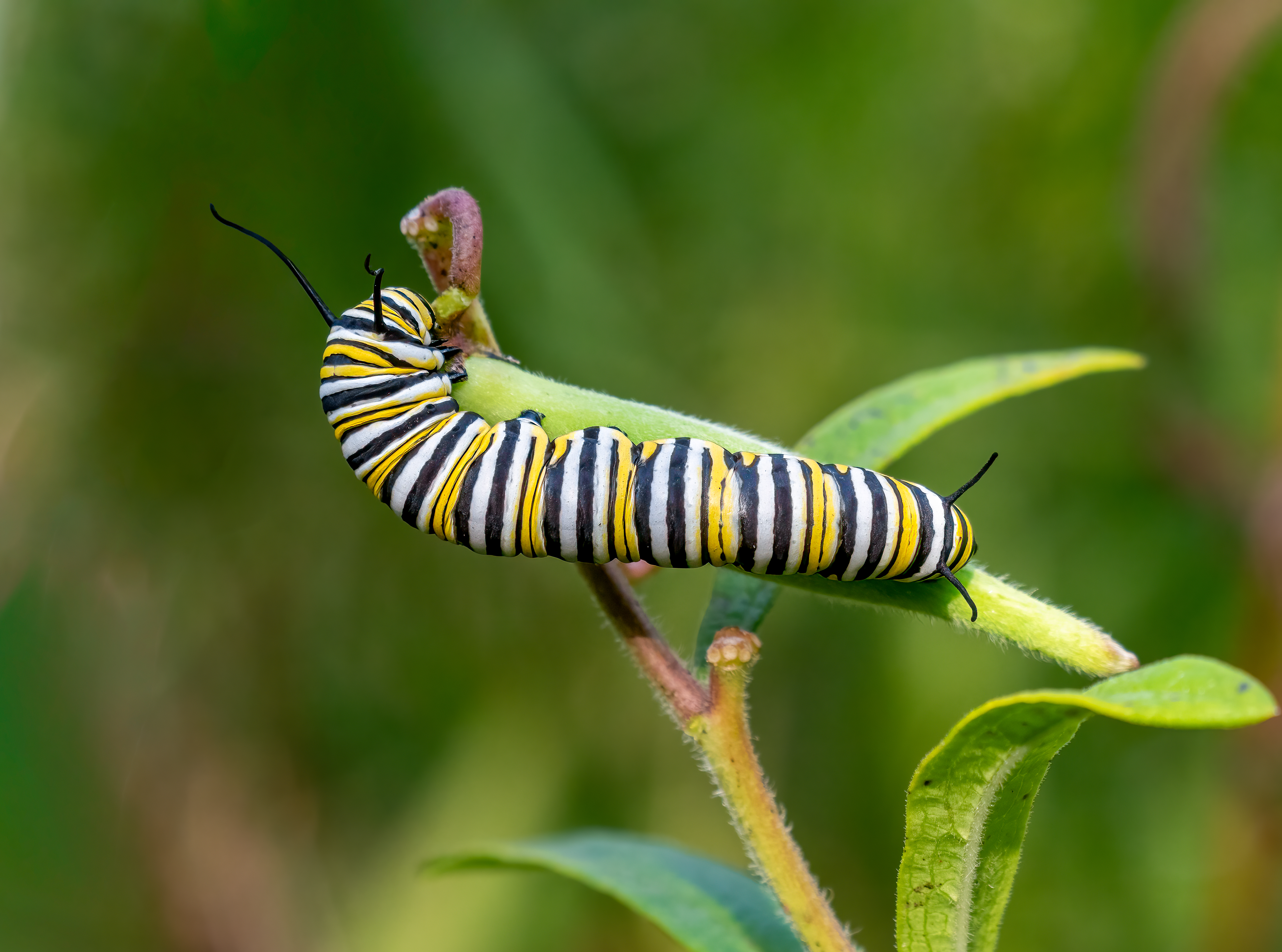
Monarch caterpillar

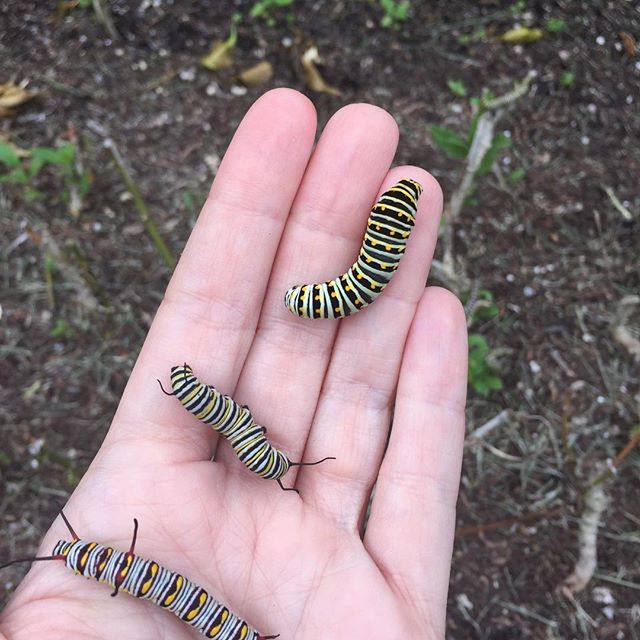
Size comparison between a parsley worm (top), a monarch caterpillar (middle), and a queen caterpillar (bottom) all on a human hand

The larva (caterpillar) has five stages (instars), molting at the end of each instar. Instars last about 3 to 5 days, depending on factors such as temperature and food availability.

The first-instar caterpillar that emerges from the egg is pale green or grayish-white, shiny, almost translucent, with a large, black head. It lacks banding coloration or tentacles. The larva or caterpillar eats its egg case and begins to feed on milkweed in a circular motion, often leaving a characteristic, arc-shaped hole in the leaf. Older first-instar larvae have dark stripes on a greenish background and develop small bumps that later become front tentacles. The first instar is usually between 2 and 6 mm (0.079 and 0.236 in) long.

The second-instar larva develops a characteristic pattern of white, yellow, and black transverse bands. The larva has a yellow triangle on the head and two sets of yellow bands around this central triangle. It is no longer translucent and is covered in short setae. Pairs of black tentacles begin to grow, a larger pair on the thorax and a smaller pair on the abdomen. The second instar is usually between 6 mm (0.24 in) and 1 cm (0.39 in) long.

Fifth-instar monarch caterpillar eating milkweed leaves (Some at 20 × speed). A second-instar larva grazing on a leaf and cutting through a latex vein.

The third-instar larva has more distinct bands and the two pairs of tentacles become longer. Legs on the thorax differentiate into smaller pairs near the head and larger pairs further back. Third-instar larvae usually feed using a cutting motion on leaf edges. The third instar is usually between 1 and 1.5 cm (0.39 and 0.59 in) long. The fourth-instar larva has a different banding pattern. It develops white spots on the prolegs near its back, and is usually between 1.5 and 2.5 cm (0.59 and 0.98 in) long.

The fifth-instar larva has a more complex banding pattern and white dots on the prolegs, with small front legs very close to the head. Its length ranges from 2.5 to 4.5 cm (0.98 to 1.77 in). The larvae typically chew through a latex vein to relieve the pressure and feed above it. Fifth-instar larvae often chew a notch in the petiole of the leaf they are eating, which relieves the latex pressure and causes the leaf to fall into a vertical position.

As the caterpillar completes its growth, it is 4.5 cm (1.8 in) long (large specimens can reach 5 cm (2.0 in)) and 7 to 8 mm (0.28 to 0.31 in) wide, and weighs about 1.5 g (0.053 oz), compared to the first instar, which is 2 to 6 mm (0.079 to 0.236 in) long and 0.5 to 1.5 mm (0.020 to 0.059 in) wide. Fifth-instar larvae greatly increase in size and weight. They then stop feeding and are often found far from milkweed plants as they seek a site for pupating. A monarch caterpillar can travel up to 10 meters from its milkweed plant to find a safe place to pupate.

In a laboratory setting, the fourth- and fifth-instar caterpillar stages showed aggressive behavior with lower food availability. Attacked caterpillars were found to be attacked when feeding on milkweed leaves, and the caterpillars attacked when foraging for milkweed. This demonstrates the aggressive behavior of monarch caterpillars due to the availability of milkweed.

=== Pupa ===
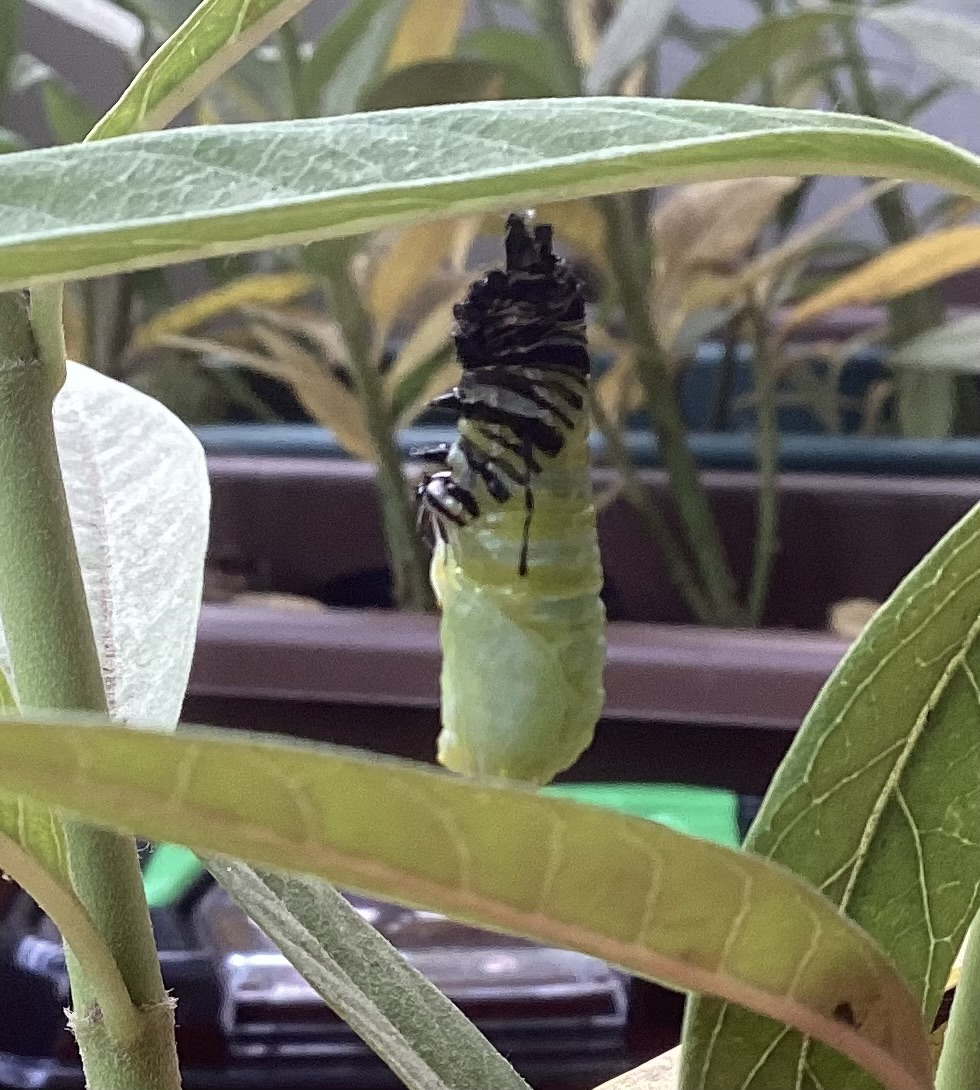
A caterpillar metamorphosing into a pupa

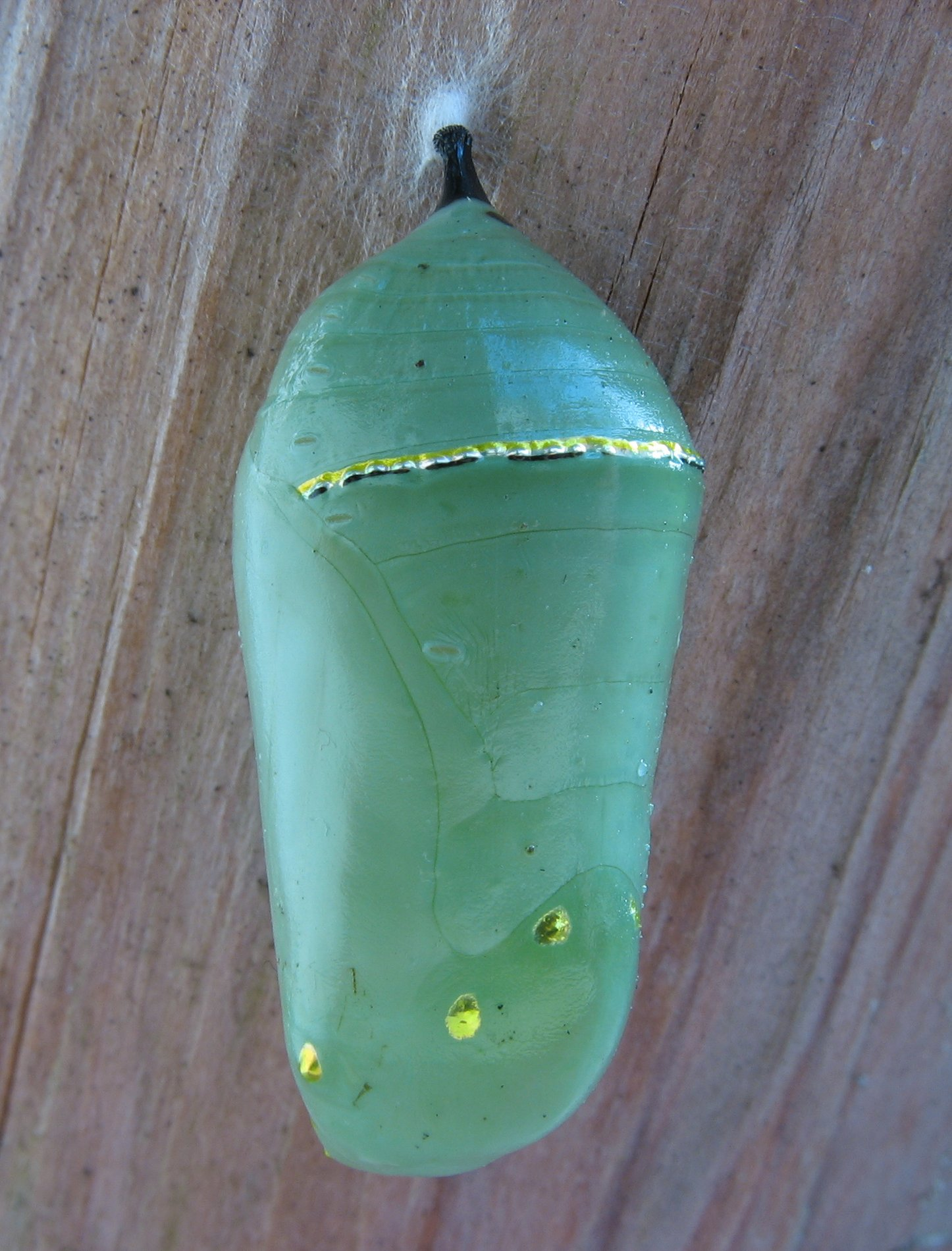
Chrysalis

To prepare for the pupal or chrysalis stage, the caterpillar chooses a safe place for pupation, where it spins a silk pad on a downward-facing horizontal surface. At this point, it turns around and securely latches on with its last pair of hind legs and hangs upside down, in the form of the letter J. After "J-hanging" for about 12–16 hours, it soon straightens out its body and goes into peristalsis some seconds before its skin splits behind its head. It then sheds its skin over a few minutes, revealing a green chrysalis. At first, the chrysalis is long, soft, and somewhat amorphous, but over a few hours, it compacts into its distinct shape – an opaque, pale-green chrysalis with small golden dots near the bottom, and a gold-and-black rim around the dorsal side near the top. At first, its exoskeleton is soft and fragile, but it hardens and becomes more durable within about a day. At this point, it is about 2.5 cm (0.98 in) long and 10–12 mm (0.39–0.47 in) wide, weighing about 1.2 g (0.042 oz). At normal summer temperatures, it matures in 8–15 days (usually 11–12 days). During this pupal stage, the adult butterfly forms inside. A day or so before emerging, the exoskeleton first becomes translucent and the chrysalis more bluish. Finally, within 12 hours or so, it becomes transparent, revealing the black and orange colors of the butterfly inside before it ecloses (emerges).

In 2009, monarchs were reared on the International Space Station as part of the Monarchs in Space project, launched aboard the Space Shuttle Atlantis mission STS-129, successfully emerging from pupae located in the station's Commercial Generic Bioprocessing Apparatus.

=== Adult ===
The adult emerges from its chrysalis after about two weeks of pupation. The emergent adult hangs upside down for several hours while it pumps fluids and air into its wings, which expand, dry, and stiffen. The butterfly then extends and retracts its wings. Once conditions allow, it flies and feeds on many nectar plants. During the breeding season, adults reach sexual maturity in 4–5 days. However, the migrating generation does not reach maturity until overwintering is complete.

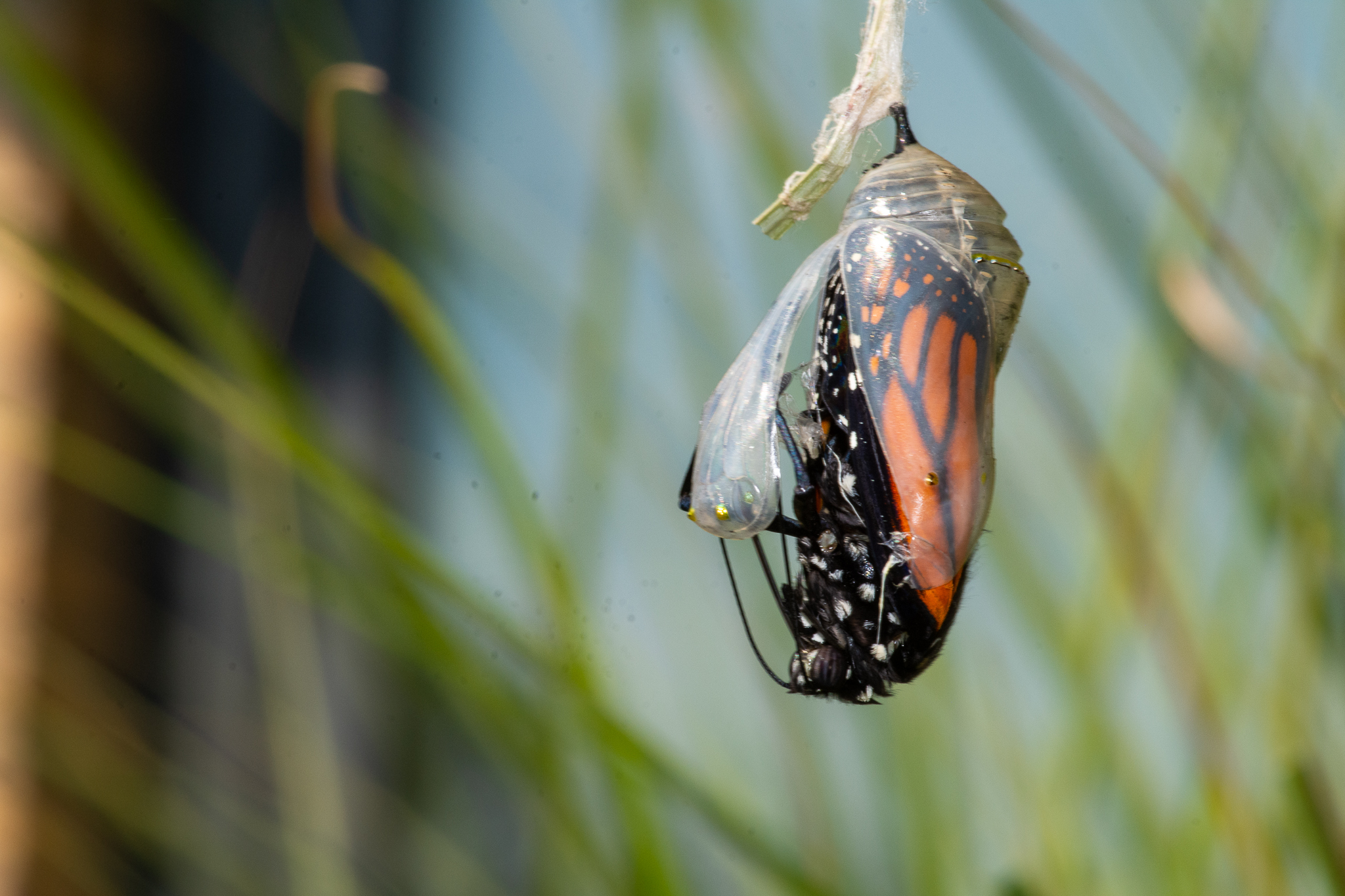
A monarch emerging from its chrysalis

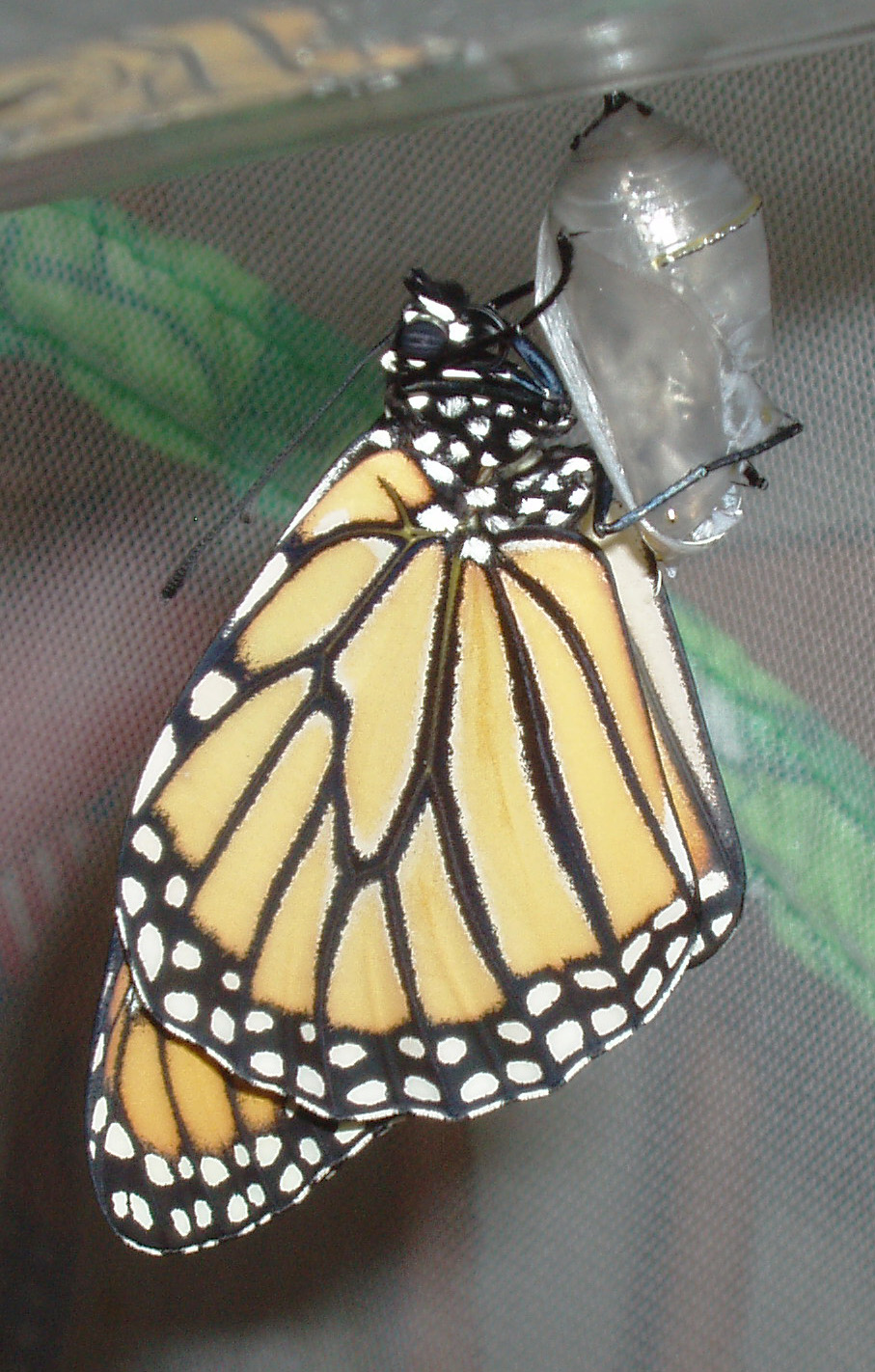
An emergent monarch clinging to its chrysalis shell

Monarch butterflies flying and sipping nectar from milkweed flowers

The adult's wingspan ranges from 8.9 to 10.2 centimetres (3.5 to 4.0 in). The upper sides of the wings are tawny orange, the veins and margins are black, and two series of small white spots occur in the margins. Monarch forewings also have a few orange spots near their tips. Wing undersides are similar, but the tips of forewings and hindwings are yellow-brown instead of tawny orange and the white spots are larger. The shape and color of the wings change at the beginning of the migration and appear redder and more elongated than later migrants. Wings size and shape differ between migratory and nonmigratory monarchs. Monarchs from eastern North America have larger and more angular forewings than the western population.

In eastern North American populations, overall wing size in the physical dimensions of wings varies. Males tend to have larger wings than females and are typically heavier than females. Both males and females have similar thoracic dimensions. Female monarchs tended to have thicker wings, which are thought to convey greater tensile strength and reduce the likelihood of being damaged during migration. Additionally, females had lower wing loading than males, meaning females require less energy to fly.

Adults are sexually dimorphic. Males are slightly larger than females and have a black spot on a vein on each hindwing. The spots contain androconial scales that produce pheromones that many Lepidoptera use during courtship. Females are often darker than males and have wider veins on their wings. The ends of the abdomens of males and females differ in shape.

The adult thorax has six legs, but like all Nymphalidae, the forelegs are small and held against the body. The butterfly uses only its middle and hind legs when walking and clinging.

Adults typically live for 2–5 weeks during their breeding season. Larvae growing in high densities are smaller, have lower survival, and weigh less as adults compared with those growing in lower densities.

Excessive cardenolide consumption adversely affects the growth and survival of monarch larvae. When laying eggs, reproducing monarch females therefore tend to select individual milkweed plants, such as many of those of Asclepias syriaca (common milkweed), whose sap has moderate levels of cardenolides.

=== Male ===
Male monarch butterflies can be distinguished from females by the small, black, fuzzy spots on their hind wings, which are scent glands used for courtship, and by their slightly thinner black wing veins.

=== Female ===
Female monarch butterflies lack these spots, have a darker, more orange-brown appearance, and generally have thicker, wider black wing veins than males.

== Vision ==
Physiological experiments suggest that monarch butterflies view the world through a tetrachromatic system. Like humans, their retina contain three types of opsin proteins, expressed in distinct photoreceptor cells, each of which absorbs light at a different wavelength. Unlike humans, one of those types of photoreceptor cells corresponds to a wavelength in the ultraviolet range; the other two correspond to blue and green.

In addition to these three photoreceptor cells in the main retina, monarch butterfly eyes contain orange filtering pigments that filter the light reaching some green-absorbing opsins, thereby making a fourth photoreceptor cell sensitive to longer-wavelength light. The combination of filtered and unfiltered green opsins allows the butterflies to distinguish yellow from orange colors. The ultraviolet opsin protein has also been detected in the dorsal rim region of monarch eyes. One study suggests that this allows the butterflies to detect ultraviolet-polarized skylight to orient themselves with the sun for their long migratory flight.

These butterflies are capable of distinguishing colors based on their wavelength only, and not based on intensity; this phenomenon is termed "true color vision". This is important for many butterfly behaviors, including seeking nectar for nourishment, choosing a mate, and finding milkweed on which to lay eggs. One study found that floral color is more easily recognized at a distance by butterflies searching for nectar than floral shape. This may be because flowers have highly contrasting colors to the green background of a vegetative landscape. Leaf shape is important for oviposition so that the butterflies can ensure their eggs are laid on milkweed.

Beyond the perception of color, the ability to remember certain colors is essential in the life of monarch butterflies. These insects can easily learn to associate color, and to a lesser extent, shape, with sugary food rewards. When searching for nectar, color is the first cue that draws the insect's attention toward a potential food source, and shape is a secondary characteristic that promotes the process. When searching for a place to lay its eggs, the roles of color and shape are switched. Also, a difference may exist between male and female butterflies from other species regarding the ability to learn certain colors; however, no differences are noted between the sexes for monarch butterflies.

== Courtship and mating ==
Monarch butterflies mating (video)

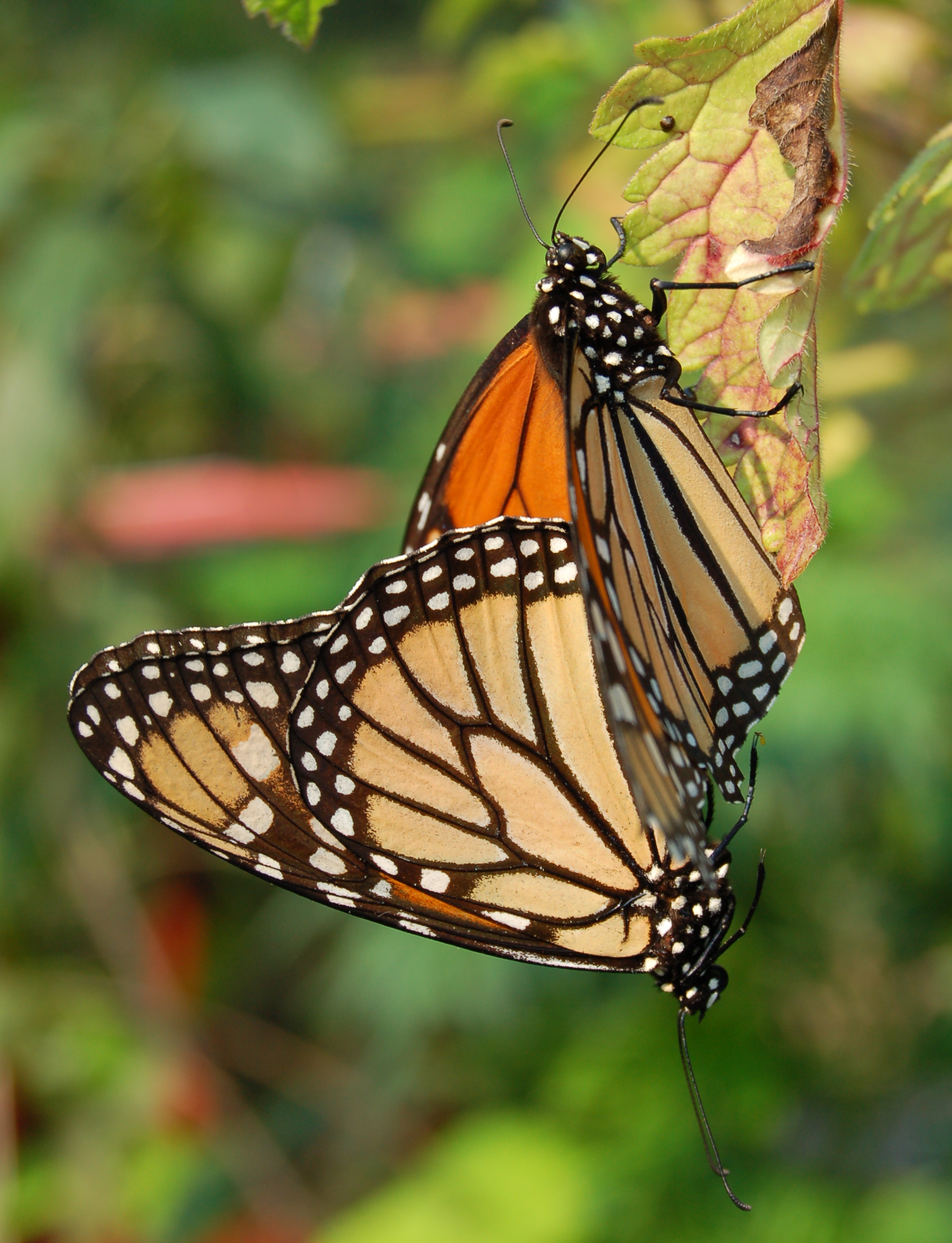
Monarch butterflies mating with male clinging to leaf

Monarch courtship occurs in two phases. During the aerial phase, a male pursues and often forces a female to the ground. During a ground phase and a post-nuptial flight, the butterflies copulate and remain attached for up to 16 hours. Only 30% of mating attempts end in copulation, suggesting that females can avoid mating, though some have more success than others. During copulation, a male transfers his spermatophore to a female. Along with sperm, the spermatophore provides a female with nutrition, which aids her in laying eggs. An increase in spermatophore size increases the fecundity of female monarchs. Males that produce larger spermatophores also fertilize more females' eggs.

Females and males typically mate more than once. Females that mate several times lay more eggs. Mating for the overwintering populations occurs in the spring, before dispersion. Mating is less dependent on pheromones than in other species in its genus. Male search and capture strategies may influence copulatory success, and human-induced changes to the habitat can influence monarch mating activity at overwintering sites.

== Distribution and habitat ==
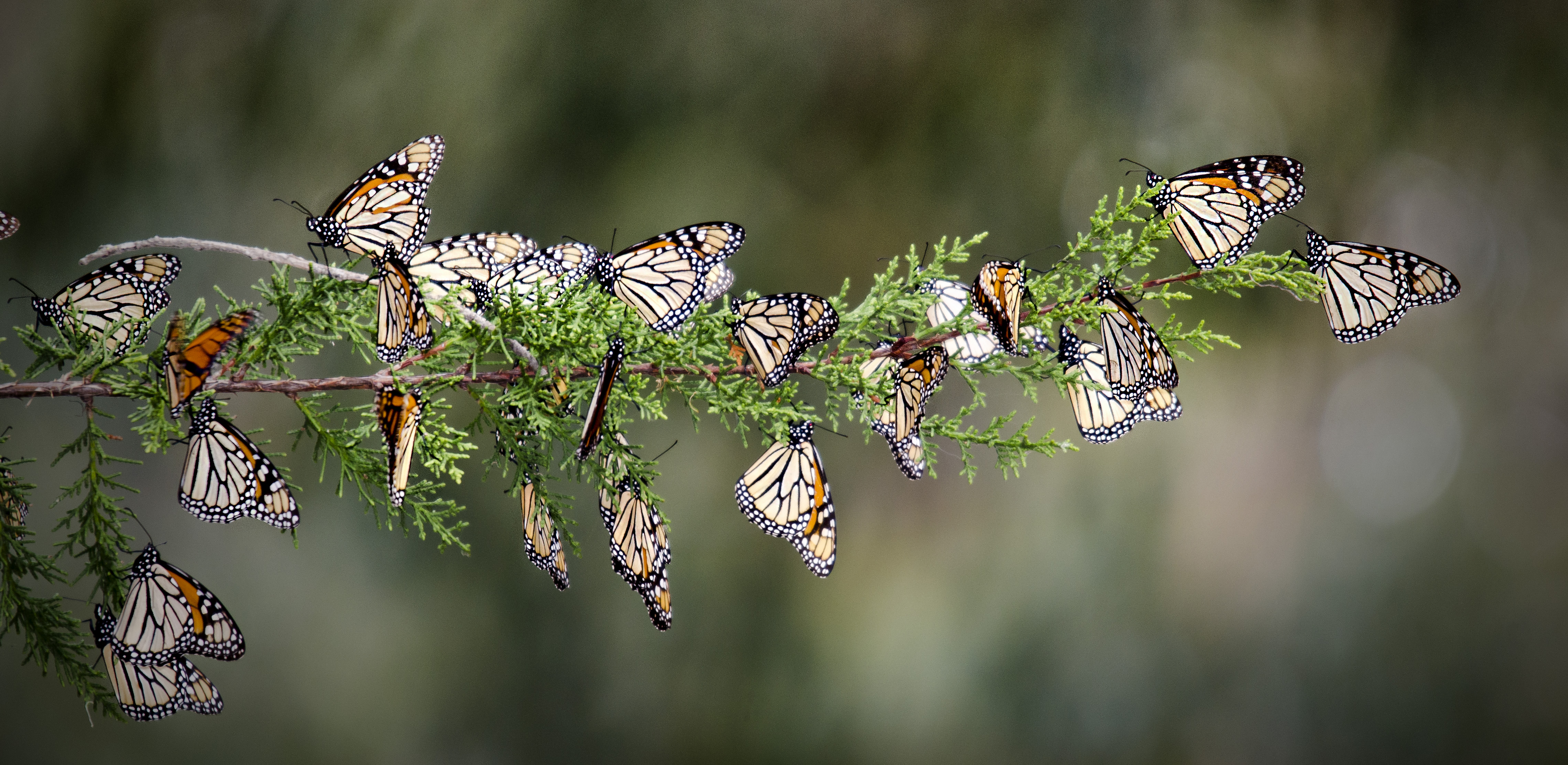
String of monarchs wintering at California's Pismo State Beach Monarch Preserve (2015)

The range of the western and eastern populations of D. p. plexippus expands and contracts depending upon the season. The range differs between breeding areas, migration routes, and winter roosts. However, no genetic differences between the western and eastern monarch populations exist; reproductive isolation has not led to subspeciation of these populations, as it has elsewhere within the species' range.

In the Americas, the monarch ranges from southern Canada through northern South America. It is also found in Bermuda, the Cook Islands, Hawaii, Cuba, and other Caribbean islands, the Solomons, New Caledonia, New Zealand, Papua New Guinea, Australia, the Azores, the Canary Islands, Madeira, continental Portugal, Gibraltar, the Philippines, and Morocco. It appears in the UK in some years as an accidental migrant.

Overwintering populations of D. p. plexippus are found in Mexico, California, along the Gulf Coast of the United States, year-round in Florida, and in Arizona where the habitat has the specific conditions necessary for survival. On the East Coast of the United States, they have overwintered as far north as Virginia Beach, Virginia. Their wintering habitat typically provides access to streams, plenty of sunlight (enabling body temperatures that allow flight), and appropriate roosting vegetation, and is relatively free of predators.

Overwintering, roosting butterflies have been seen on basswoods, elms, sumacs, locusts, oaks, osage-oranges, mulberries, pecans, willows, cottonwoods, and mesquites. While breeding, monarch habitats can be found in agricultural fields, pasture land, prairie remnants, urban and suburban residential areas, gardens, trees, and roadsides – anywhere there is access to larval host plants.

== Larval host plants ==
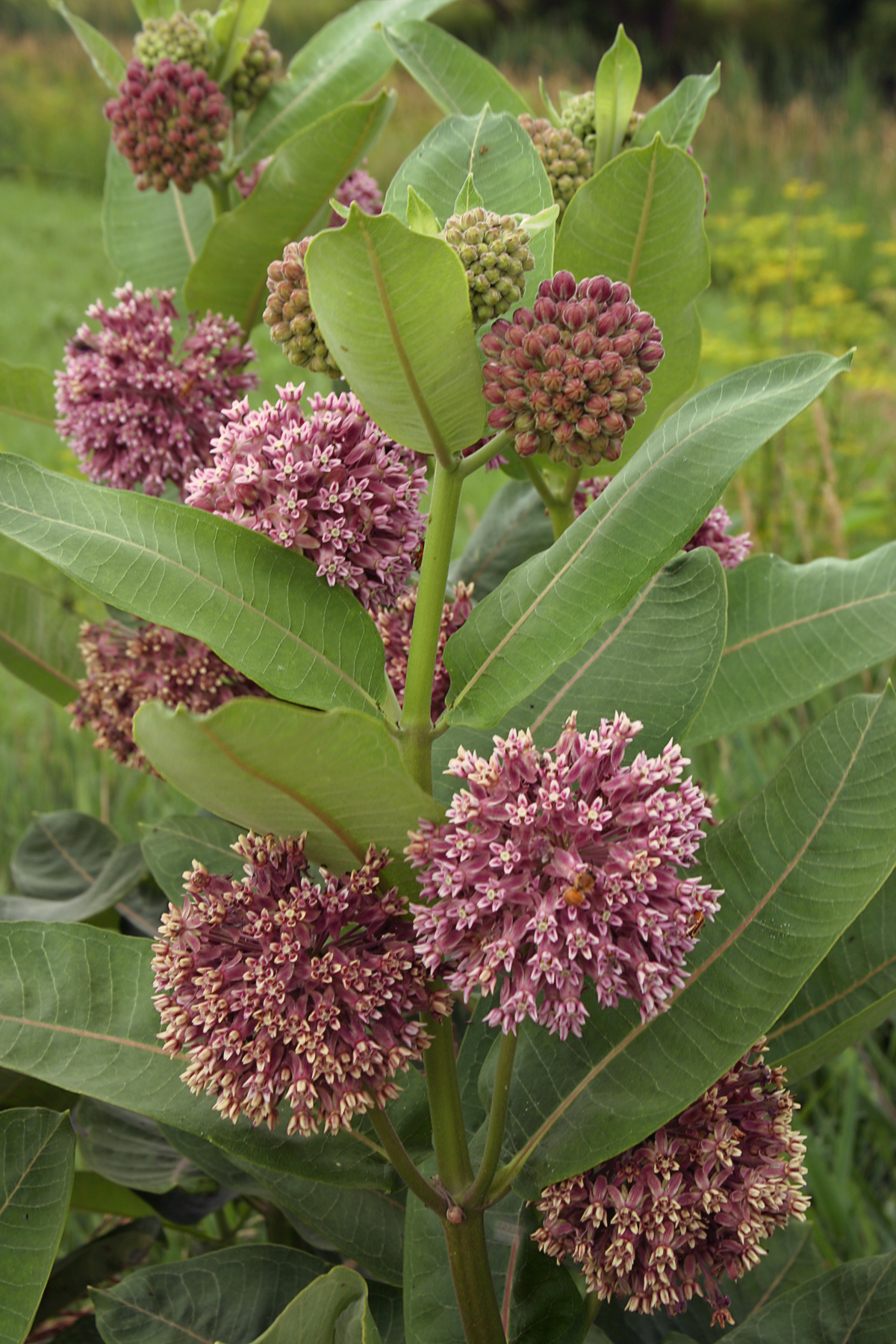
Asclepias syriaca, common milkweed

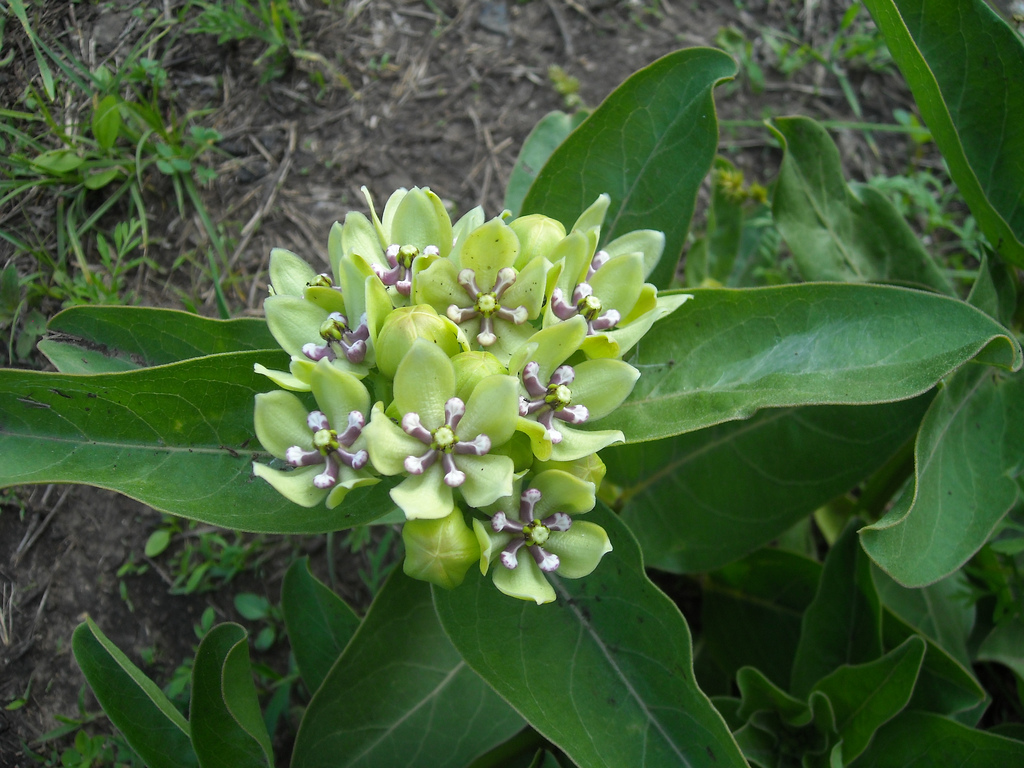
Asclepias viridis, green antelopehorn milkweed

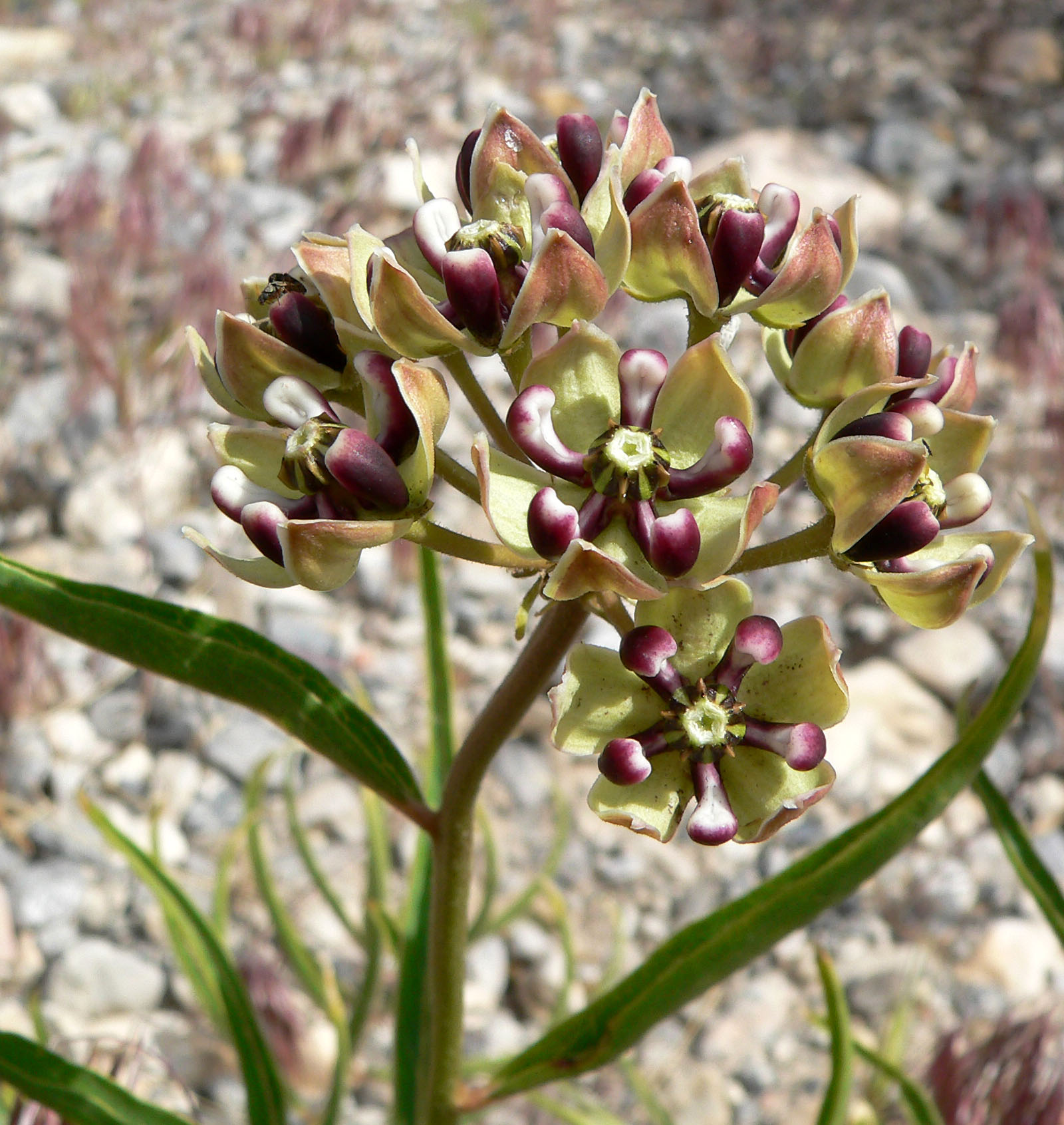
Asclepias asperula, antelope horns milkweed

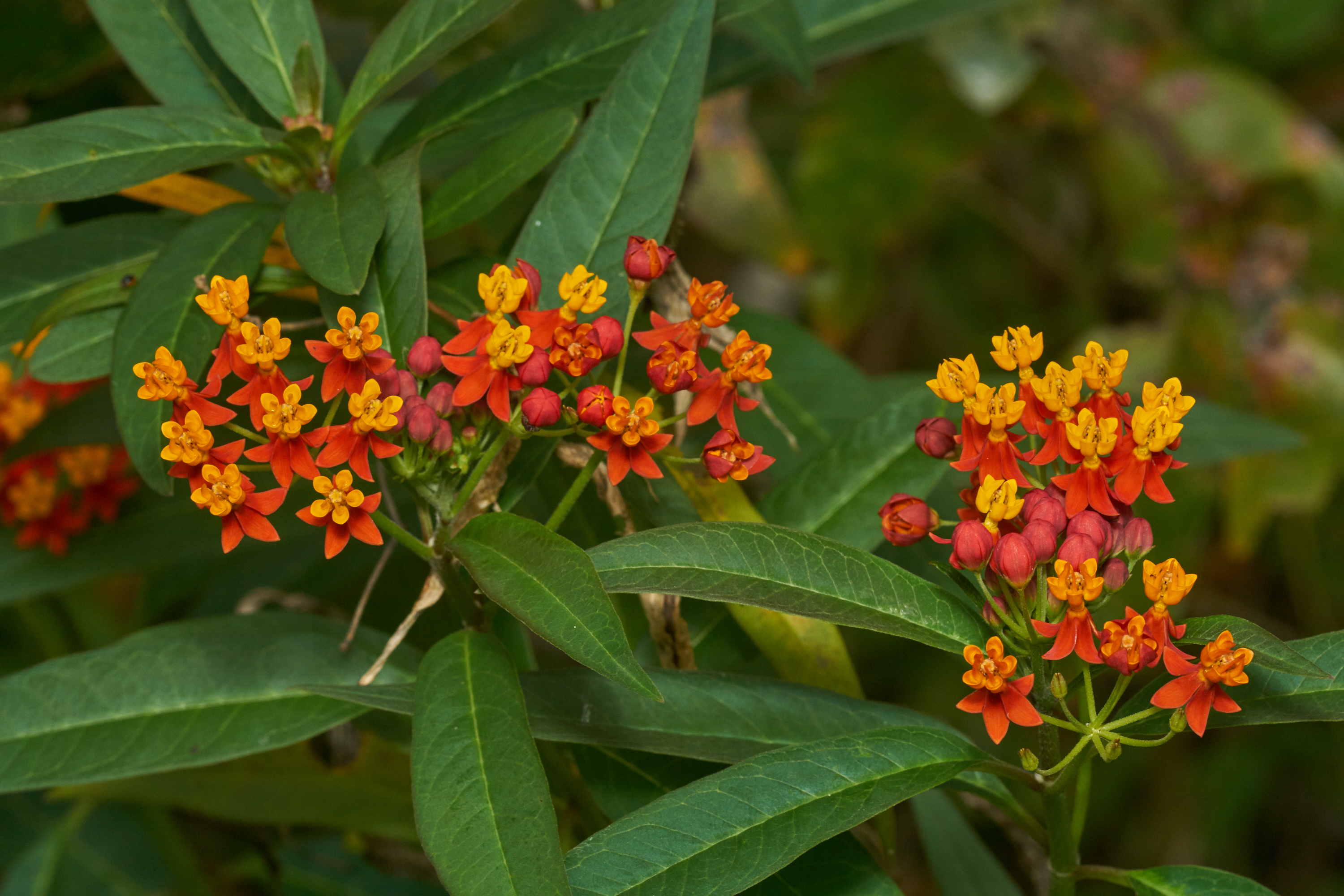
Asclepias curassavica, tropical milkweed

The host plants used by the monarch caterpillar include:

- Araujia sericifera – white bladderflower
- Asclepias amplexicaulis − clasping milkweed
- Asclepias angustifolia – Arizona milkweed
- Asclepias albicans – whitestem milkweed
- Asclepias asperula – antelope horns milkweed
- Asclepias californica – California milkweed
- Asclepias cinerea − Carolina milkweed
- Asclepias connivens − largeflower milkweed
- Asclepias cordifolia – heartleaf milkweed
- Asclepias curassavica – tropical milkweed
- Asclepias eriocarpa – woollypod milkweed
- Asclepias erosa – desert milkweed
- Asclepias exaltata – poke milkweed
- Asclepias fascicularis – Mexican whorled milkweed
- Asclepias feayi − Florida milkweed
- Asclepias hirtella – tall green milkweed
- Asclepias humistrata – sandhill/pinewoods milkweed
- Asclepias incarnata – swamp milkweed
- Asclepias lanceolata – fewflower milkweed
- Asclepias linaria – pineneedle milkweed
- Asclepias longifolia − longleaf milkweed
- Asclepias meadii – Meade's milkweed
- Asclepias nivea – Caribbean milkweed
- Asclepias oenotheroides – zizotes milkweed
- Asclepias pedicellata − savannah milkweed
- Asclepias perennis – aquatic milkweed
- Asclepias quadrifolia – four-leaved milkweed
- Asclepias rubra − red milkweed
- Asclepias speciosa – showy milkweed
- Asclepias subulata – rush milkweed
- Asclepias sullivantii – prairie milkweed
- Asclepias syriaca – common milkweed
- Asclepias tomentosa − velvet milkweed
- Asclepias tuberosa – butterfly weed
- Asclepias variegata – white milkweed
- Asclepias verticillata – whorled milkweed
- Asclepias vestita – woolly milkweed
- Asclepias viridis – green antelopehorn milkweed
- Calotropis gigantea – crown flower
- Calotropis procera – giant milkweed
- Cynanchum angustifolium – Gulf coast swallow-wort
- Cynanchum laeve – sand vine milkweed
- Gomphocarpus fruticosus – swan plant
- Gomphocarpus physocarpus – balloon plant
- Sarcostemma clausa – white vine

The World Wildlife Fund has published lists of milkweed species that thrive in each of six U.S. regions: Western, Northeast, Southeast, South-central, Arizona, and California. The eastern monarch migration largely depends upon only three of these species: Asclepias syriaca, A. viridis, and A. asperula. Using cardenolide fingerprinting analysis, investigators have found that 85–92% of monarchs overwintering in Mexico had fed on A. syriaca as caterpillars, while 84% of the first-generation monarchs that colonized the Upper Midwest had fed as larvae on A. viridis.

However, Asclepias curassavica, or tropical milkweed, is often planted as an ornamental in butterfly gardens. Year-round plantings in the U.S. are controversial and criticized, as they may cause new overwintering sites along the U.S. Gulf Coast, leading to year-round breeding of monarchs. This is thought to adversely affect migration patterns and to cause a dramatic buildup of the dangerous parasite, Ophryocystis elektroscirrha. New research also has shown that monarch larvae reared on tropical milkweed show reduced migratory development (reproductive diapause), and when migratory adults are exposed to tropical milkweed, it stimulates reproductive tissue growth.

== Adult food sources ==
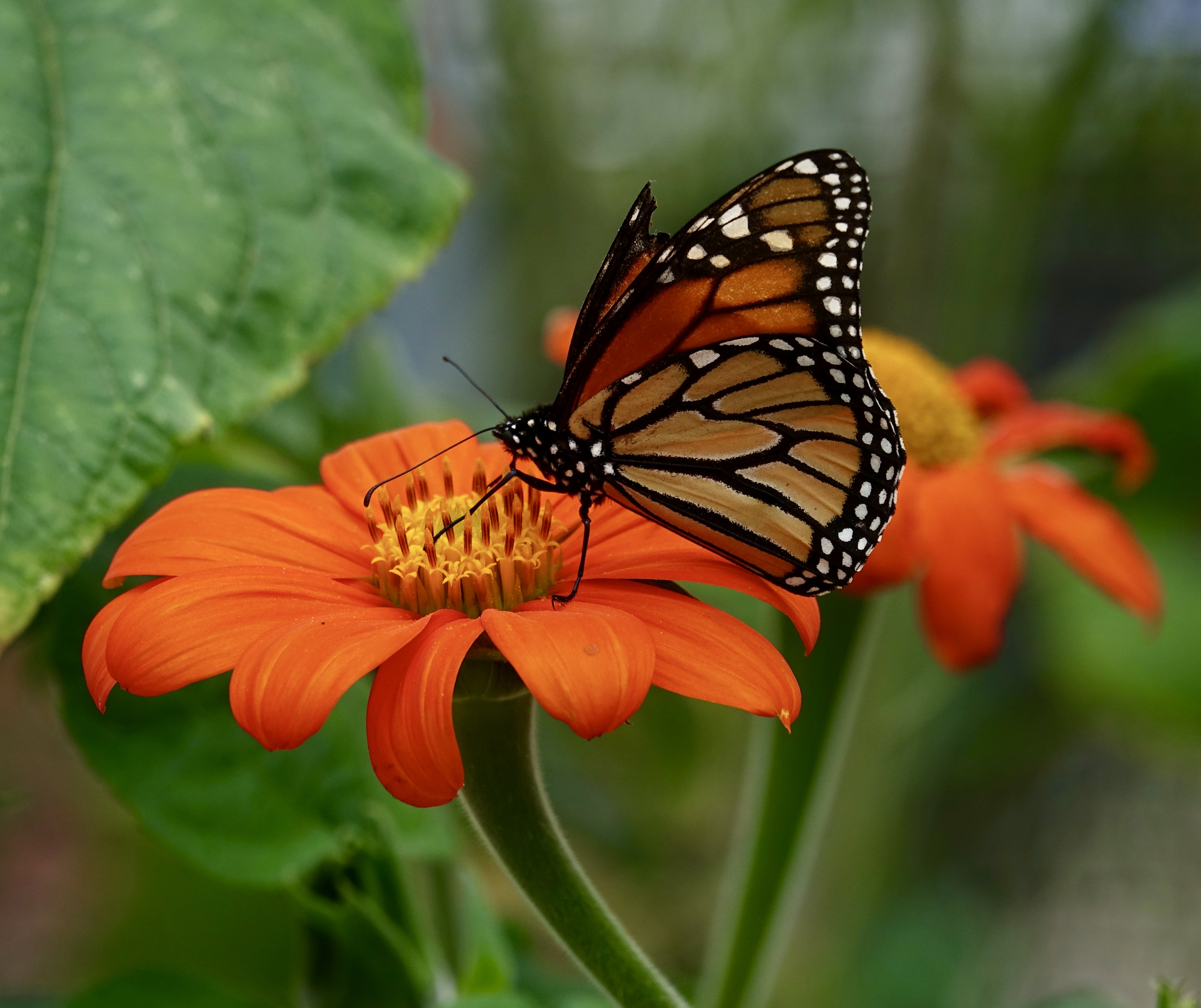
Nectaring on Mexican sunflower (Tithonia rotundifolia) (August 2019)

Nectaring on butterfly-bush (Buddleja) (2006)

Although monarch larvae eat only milkweed, adult monarchs and other pollinators feed on the nectar of many plants, including:

- Apocynum cannabinum − Indian hemp
- Asclepias spp. − milkweeds
- Asteraceae family (many genera, including Eurybia − asters)
- Buddleja davidii − butterfly-bush
- Caryopteris × clandonensis − bluebeard
- Ceanothus americanus − New Jersey tea
- Cephalanthus occidentalis − buttonbush
- Cercis spp. − redbuds
- Cirsium spp. − thistles
- Clethra alnifolia − coastal sweetpepperbush
- Conoclinium coelestinum − blue mistflower
- Coreopsis spp. − calliopsis, tickseed
- Chromolaena odorata - jack in the bush
- Daucus carota − wild carrot
- Dasiphora fruticosa − shrubby cinquefoil
- Diervilla spp. − bush honeysuckle
- Dipsacus sylvestris − teasel
- Echinacea spp. − coneflowers
- Erigeron canadensis − horseweed
- Erigeron glaucus − Seaside fleabane
- Eutrochium (Eupatorium) spp. − Joe-Pye weeds, including Eupatorium maculatum (spotted Joe-Pye weed)
- Eupatorium perfoliatum − common boneset
- Hamelia patens − firebush
- Helianthus spp. − sunflowers
- Heptacodium miconioides − seven-son flower
- Hesperis matronalis − dame's rocket
- Hibiscus syriacus − rose of Sharon
- Hypericum kalmianum − Kalm's St. John's wort
- Itea virginica − Virginia sweetspire
- Lantana spp. − lantanas
- Liatris spp. − blazing stars
- Lindera benzoin − spicebush
- Medicago sativa − alfalfa
- Monarda spp. − beebalms
- Phlox spp.— phloxes
- Prunus americana − American plum
- Prunus serotina − black cherry
- Pycnanthemum spp. − mountain mints
- Rhus spp. − sumacs
- Ribes odoratum − clove currant
- Rudbeckia spp. − coneflowers, black-eyed-susans
- Sambucus spp. − elderberries
- Solidago spp. − goldenrods
- Spiraea alba − meadowsweet
- Symphyotrichum spp. − asters
- Syringa vulgaris – common lilac
- Tithonia rotundifolia − Mexican sunflower
- Trifolium pinetorum – woods clover
- Trifolium pratense – red clover
- Vaccinium spp. – blueberries
- Verbena spp. − verbenas
- Verbesina virginica – frostweed
- Vernonia spp. – ironweeds, including Vernonia gigantea (giant ironweed) and Vernonia lettermannii (narrowleaf ironweed)
- Viburnum spp. – viburnums

Adult monarchs prefer to feed on sturdy plants that have relatively flat surfaces (sunflowers, asters) or long multi-flowering inflorescences (gayfeather), where the nectar is easily accessed, as in many species in the Asteraceae (sunflower) family. Common characteristics of this family include clusters of flowers with shallow, easily accessed nectar. Milkweeds, which also have easily accessible nectar, are excellent nectar sources.

Publications have reported that Mexican sunflower (Tithonia rotundifolia) is especially attractive to adult monarchs. Like that species, coneflowers (Echinacea spp.), gayfeathers (Liatris spp.), goldenrods (Solidago spp.), blue mistflower (Conoclinium coelestinum), frostweed (Verbesina virginica), Joe-Pye weeds (Eutrochium spp.), ironweeds (Vernonia spp.), asters (Symphyotrichum spp. and Eurybia spp.) and other late-flowering genera of the Asteraceae family, are major nectar sources for monarchs during their fall migration. During the spring migration, important nectar sources include early-blooming Asclepias spp., Coreopsis spp., Viburnum spp., and Phlox spp. Monarchs obtain moisture and minerals from damp soil and wet gravel, a behavior known as mud-puddling.

== Flight and migration ==
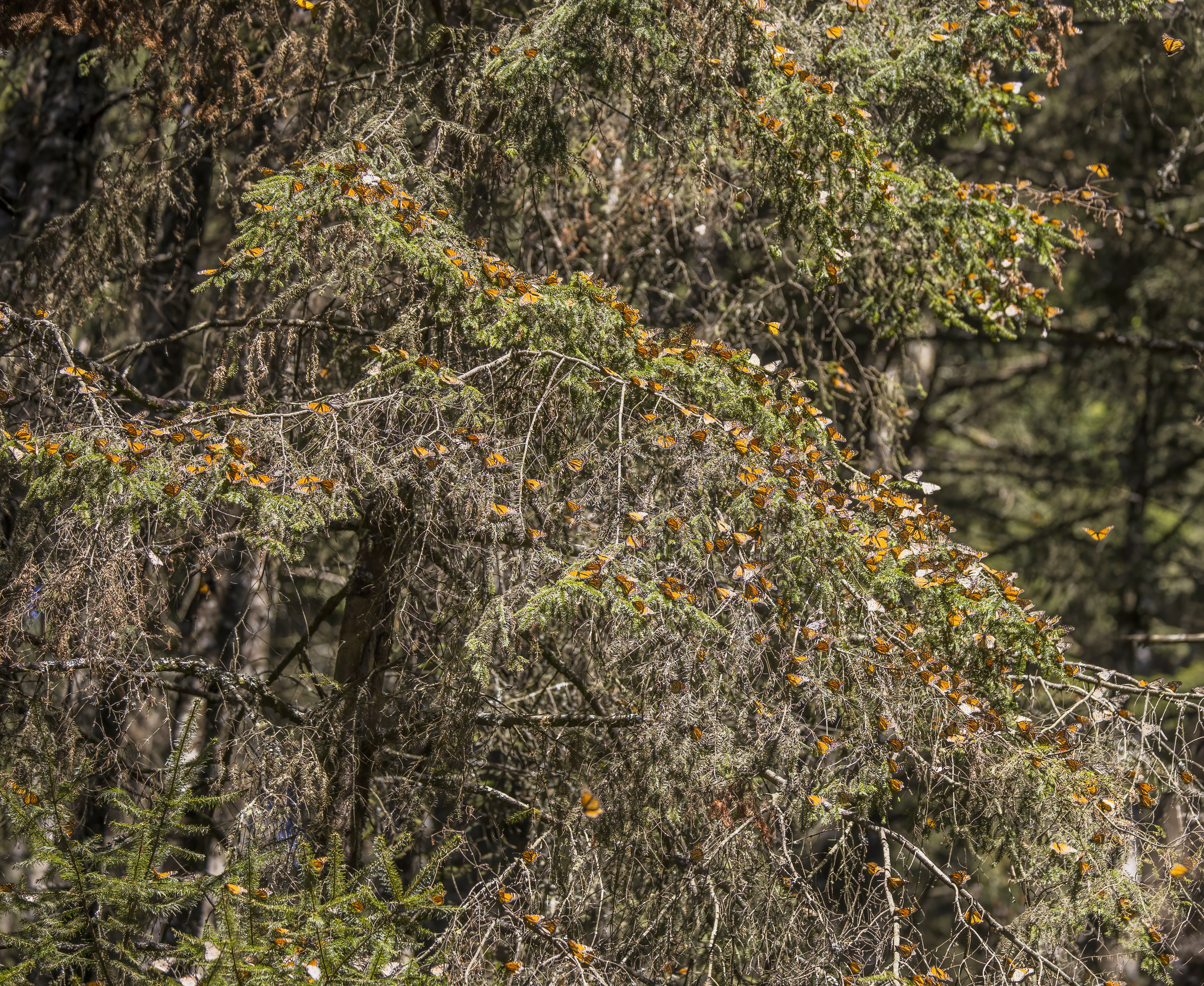
Overwintering on Oyamel fir (Abies religiosa) in Piedra Herrada, Mexico, within the Monarch Butterfly Biosphere Reserve (February 2023)

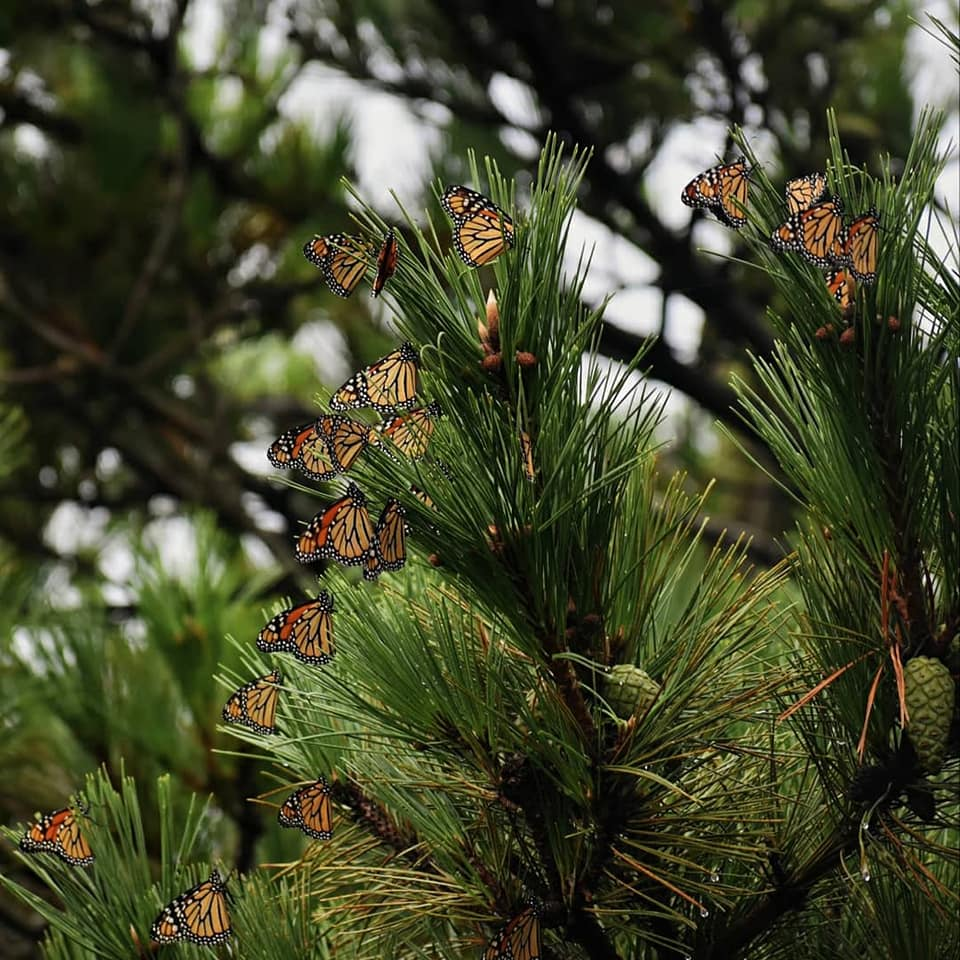
Migrating monarchs resting on a pine tree in Fire Island National Seashore on Fire Island, New York (September 2021)

In North America, monarchs migrate both north and south on an annual basis, making long-distance journeys that are fraught with risks. This is a multi-generational migration, with individual monarchs only making part of the full journey. The population east of the Rocky Mountains attempts to migrate to the sanctuaries of the Monarch Butterfly Biosphere Reserve in the Mexican state of Michoacán northwest of Mexico City, the Joya Redonda Monarch Butterfly Sanctuary, located 50 miles (80 km) southeast of Mexico City in the foothills of the volcanoes Popocatépetl and Ixtaccíhuatl in the State of México's municipality of Atlautla, and to parts of Florida.

The western population tries to reach overwintering destinations in various coastal sites in central and southern California. The populations east of the Rocky Mountains, which mostly overwinter in central Mexico, may return the following spring as far north as Texas and Oklahoma before producing offspring to carry the journey northward. The second, third, and fourth generations return to their northern locations in the United States and Canada later in the spring and far into the summer.

Flight speeds of adults are around 9 km/h (6 mph). Monarchs travel between 1,200 and 2,800 miles or more from the northeast United States, and southeast Canada, to the mountain forests in central Mexico, where they find the right climate conditions to hibernate from the beginning of November to mid-March.

In 2025, Project Monarch deployed over 400 solar-powered ultralight transmitters on the thoraxes of that year's southward-migrating monarchs. A mid-November 2025 web page showed the routes that the monarchs had taken up to that time.

Captive-raised monarchs appear capable of migrating to overwintering sites in Mexico, though they have a much lower migratory success rate than do wild monarchs (see section on captive-rearing below). Monarch overwintering sites have been discovered recently in Arizona. Monarchs from the eastern U.S. generally migrate longer distances than monarchs from the western U.S.

Since the 1800s, monarchs have spread globally, and there are now many non-migratory populations.

Climate change and habitat loss have significantly altered the monarch butterfly's migration behavior. Rising temperatures and the widespread loss of milkweed (Asclepias spp.), the primary host plant for monarch larvae, have disrupted breeding and migratory patterns across North America, contributing to population declines over the past two decades.

== Interactions with predators ==
In both caterpillar and butterfly forms, monarchs are aposematic, warding off predators with a bright display of contrasting colors to warn potential predators of their undesirable taste and poisonous characteristics. When discussing a recent publication that had described species distribution models for natural enemies of monarchs, a monarch scientist emphasized that predation on eggs, larvae, or adults is natural since monarchs are part of the food chain.

Larvae feed exclusively on milkweed and consume protective cardiac glycosides. Toxin levels in the Asclepias species vary. Not all monarchs are unpalatable, but exhibit Batesian or automimics. Cardiac glycoside levels are higher in the abdomen and wings. Some predators can differentiate between these parts and consume the most palatable ones.

Butterfly weed (A. tuberosa) lacks significant amounts of cardiac glycosides (cardenolides) but instead contains other types of toxic glycosides, including pregnanes. This difference may reduce the toxicity of monarchs whose larvae feed on that milkweed species and affect the butterfly's breeding choices, as a naturalist and others have reported that egg-laying monarchs do not favor the plant. Some other milkweeds have similar characteristics.

=== Types of predators ===
A European paper wasp takes a monarch butterfly caterpillar from within a narrow leaf milkweed umbel. Part is shown at one fourth speed.

While monarchs have a wide range of natural predators, none of these is suspected of causing harm to the overall population, or are the cause of the long-term declines in winter colony sizes.

Several species of birds have acquired methods that allow them to ingest monarchs without experiencing the ill effects associated with the cardiac glycosides (cardenolides). The black-backed oriole can eat the monarch through an exaptation of its feeding behavior that gives it the ability to identify cardenolides by taste and reject them. The black-headed grosbeak, though, has developed an insensitivity to secondary plant poisons that allows it to ingest monarchs without vomiting. As a result, these orioles and grosbeaks periodically have high levels of cardenolides in their bodies, and they are forced to go on periods of reduced monarch consumption. This cycle effectively reduces potential predation of monarchs by 50% indicating that monarch aposematism has a legitimate purpose. The black-headed grosbeak has also evolved resistance mutations in the molecular target of the heart poisons, the sodium pump. The specific mutations that evolved in one of the grosbeak's four copies of the sodium pump gene are the same as those found in some rodents that have also evolved to resist cardiac glycosides. Known bird predators include brown thrashers, grackles, robins, cardinals, sparrows, scrub jays, and pinyon jays.

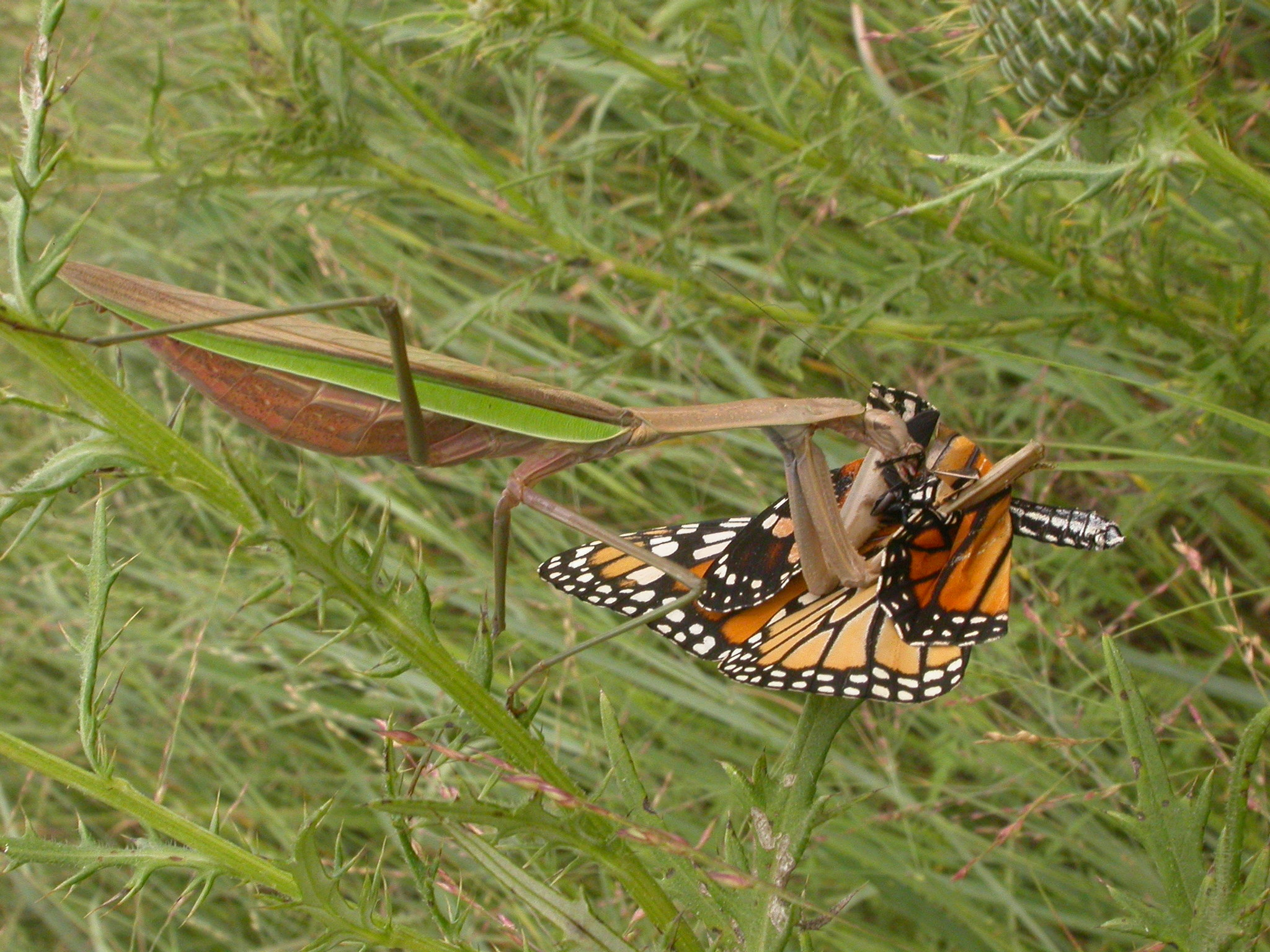
Chinese mantis feeding on a monarch butterfly. The species also feeds on monarch caterpillars, being resistant to their toxins and gutting them before consumption to remove most of the toxins.

The monarch's white morph appeared in Oahu after the 1965–1966 introduction of two bulbul bird species, Pycnonotus cafer and Pycnonotus jocosus. These are now the most common avian insectivores in Hawaii, and probably the only ones that eat insects as large as monarchs. Although Hawaiian monarchs have low cardiac glycoside levels, the birds may also be tolerant of that toxin. The two species hunt the larvae and some pupae from the branches and undersides of leaves in milkweed bushes. The bulbuls also eat resting and ovipositing adults, but rarely flying ones. Because of its color, the white morph has a higher survival rate than the orange one. This is either because of apostatic selection (i.e., the birds have learned the orange monarchs can be eaten), because of camouflage (the white morph matches the white pubescence of milkweed or the patches of light shining through foliage), or because the white morph does not fit the bird's search image of a typical monarch, so is thus avoided.

1) A stink (shield) bug killing and consuming a fourth-instar monarch larva. 2) A mature fifth instar larva jerking to dislodge a large milkweed bug (a herbivore). 3) A fourth-instar larva killed by insect parasitoids, non-insect parasites, or a pathogen.

Some mice, particularly the black-eared mouse (Peromyscus melanotis), are, like all rodents, able to tolerate large doses of cardenolides and can eat monarchs. Overwintering adults become less toxic over time making them more vulnerable to predators. In Mexico, about 14% of the overwintering monarchs are eaten by birds and mice and black-eared mice can eat up to 40 monarchs per night.

In North America, larvae and adults of the introduced Asian lady beetle (Harmonia axyridis) feed on eggs and first-instar monarch larvae. The Chinese mantis (Tenodera sinensis) will consume the larvae once the gut is removed thus avoiding cardenolides. Predatory wasps commonly consume larvae. Many Hemipteran bugs including predatory stink bugs in the subfamily Asopinae and assassin bugs in family Reduviidae prey on monarch caterpillars or eggs, as do many species of spiders, grasshoppers, crickets, ants, flies, beetles and other arthropods. Larvae can sometimes avoid predation by dropping from the plant or by jerking their bodies.

Parasitoids, including tachinid flies and braconid wasps develop inside the monarch larvae eventually killing them and emerging from the larvae or pupa. Non-insect parasites and infectious diseases (pathogens) also kill monarchs.

=== Aposematism ===
Chemical structure of oleandrin, one of the cardiac glycosides

Monarchs are toxic and foul-tasting because of the presence of cardenolides in their bodies, which the caterpillars ingest as they feed on milkweed. Monarchs and other cardenolide-resistant insects rely on a resistant form of the Na+/ K+-ATPase enzyme to tolerate significantly higher concentrations of cardenolides than nonresistant species. By ingesting a large number of plants in the genus Asclepias, primarily milkweed, monarch caterpillars can sequester cardiac glycosides, or more specifically cardenolides, which are steroids that act in heart-arresting ways similar to digitalis. It has been found that monarchs can sequester cardenolides most effectively from plants of intermediate cardenolide content rather than those of high or low content. Three mutations that evolved in the monarch's Na+/ K+-ATPase were found to be sufficient together to confer resistance to dietary cardiac glycosides. This was tested by swapping these mutations into the same gene in the fruit fly Drosophila melanogaster using CRISPR-Cas9 genome editing. These fruit flies-turned monarch flies were completely resistant to dietary ouabain, a cardiac glycoside found in Apocynaceae, and even sequestered some through metamorphosis, like the monarch.

Different milkweed species have variable effects on parasite growth, virulence, and transmission. One species, Asclepias curassavica, appears to reduce the symptoms of Ophryocystis elektroscirrha (OE) infection. The two possible explanations for this include that it promotes overall monarch health to boost the monarch's immune system or that chemicals from the plant have a direct negative effect on the OE parasites. A. curassavica does not cure or prevent the infection with OE; it merely allows infected monarchs to live longer, and this would allow infected monarchs to spread the OE spores for longer periods. For the average home butterfly garden, this scenario only adds more OE to the local population.

After the caterpillar becomes a butterfly, the toxins shift to different body parts. Since many birds attack the butterfly's wings, having three times the cardiac glycosides in the wings leaves predators with a foul taste and may prevent them from ever ingesting the butterfly's body. To combat predators that remove the wings only to ingest the abdomen, monarchs keep the most potent cardiac glycosides in their abdomens.

=== Mimicry ===
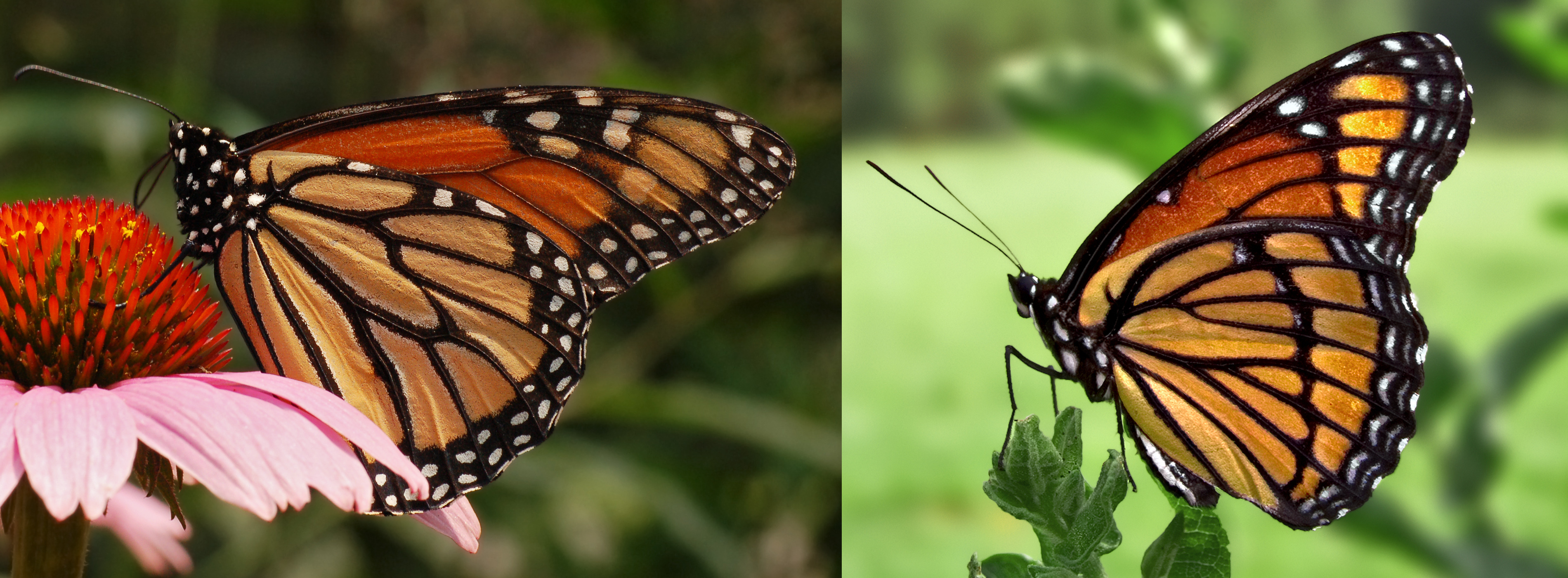
Monarch (left) and viceroy (right) butterflies exhibiting Müllerian mimicry

Monarchs share the defense of noxious taste with the similar-appearing viceroy butterfly in what is perhaps one of the most well-known examples of mimicry. Though long purported to be an example of Batesian mimicry, the viceroy is more unpalatable than the monarch, making this a case of Müllerian mimicry.

== Human interaction ==
Scientists have found that monarchs crossing roads are hit by traffic. They believe that up to 3% of migrating monarchs are killed in this way.

The monarch is the state insect of Alabama, Idaho, Illinois, Minnesota, Texas, Vermont, and West Virginia. Legislation was introduced to make it the national insect of the United States, but this failed in 1989 and again in 1991.

Homeowners are increasingly establishing butterfly gardens; monarchs can be attracted by cultivating a butterfly garden with specific milkweed species and nectar plants. These efforts are organized to establish monarch waystations.

A 2012 IMAX film, Flight of the Butterflies, describes the story of the Urquharts, Brugger, and Trail to document the then-unknown monarch migration to Mexican overwintering areas.

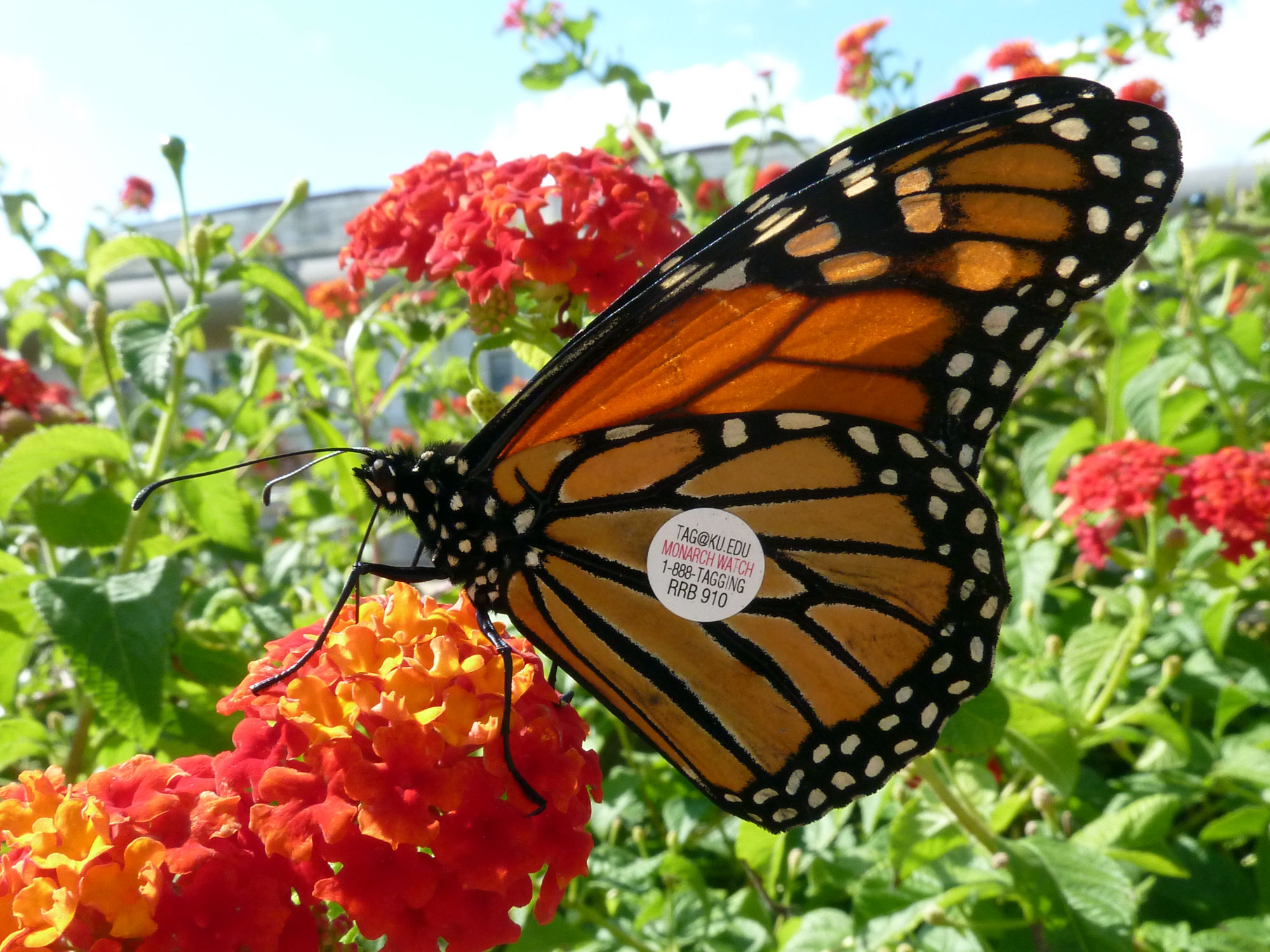
Nectaring monarch tagged for Monarch Watch (Washington, D.C., October 2012)

Sanctuaries and reserves have been created at overwintering locations in Mexico and California to limit habitat destruction. These sites can generate significant tourism revenue. However, with less tourism, monarch butterflies may exhibit higher survival rates, as butterflies in tourist isolated areas have shown increases in protein content, immune response and oxidative defense.

Organizations and individuals participate in tagging programs. Tagging information is used to study migration patterns.

The 2012 novel by Barbara Kingsolver, Flight Behavior, deals with the fictional appearance of a large population in the Appalachians.

=== Captive rearing ===
Humans interact with monarchs when rearing them in captivity. This has become increasingly popular. This is considered to be a controversial activity. On one hand, captive rearing has many positive aspects. Monarchs are reared in schools and used for butterfly releases at hospices, memorial events, and weddings. Memorial services for the September 11 attacks include the release of captive-bred monarchs. Monarchs are used in schools and nature centers for educational purposes. Adult monarchs will extend their proboscises to reach people's fingertips. With assistance, they will also extend their proboscises into a dish containing artificial food.

On the other hand, this practice becomes problematic when monarchs are "mass-reared". Stories in the Huffington Post in 2015 and Discover magazine in 2016 have summarized the controversy around this issue.

The frequent media reports of monarch declines have encouraged many homeowners to attempt to rear as many monarchs as possible in their homes and then release them to the wild to "boost the monarch population". Some individuals, such as one in Linn County, Iowa, have reared thousands of monarchs at the same time.

Some monarch scientists do not condone the practice of rearing "large" numbers of monarchs in captivity for release into the wild because of the risks of genetic issues and disease spread. One of the biggest concerns of mass rearing is the potential for spreading the monarch parasite Ophryocystis elektroscirrha into the wild. This parasite can rapidly build up in captive monarchs, especially if they are housed together. The parasite spores can quickly contaminate all housing equipment so all subsequent monarchs reared in the same containers become infected. One researcher stated that rearing more than 100 monarchs constitutes "mass rearing" and should not be done.

In addition to the disease risks, some researchers believe these captive-reared monarchs are not as fit as wild ones, owing to the unnatural conditions in which they are raised. Homeowners often raise monarchs in plastic or glass containers in their kitchens, basements, porches, etc., and under artificial lighting and controlled temperatures. Such conditions would not mimic what the monarchs are used to in the wild and may result in adults unsuited for the realities of their wild existence. In support of this, a recent study by a citizen scientist found that captive-reared monarchs have a lower migration success rate than wild monarchs.

A 2019 study shed light on captive-reared monarchs' fitness by testing reared and wild monarchs on a tethered flight apparatus that assessed navigational ability. In that study, monarchs that were reared to adulthood in artificial conditions showed a reduction in navigational ability. This happened even with monarchs brought into captivity from the wild for a few days. A few captive-reared monarchs did show proper navigation. This study revealed the fragility of monarch development; if the conditions are not suitable, their ability to properly migrate could be impaired. The same study also examined the genetics of a collection of reared monarchs purchased from a butterfly breeder and found they were dramatically different from wild monarchs, so much so that the lead author described them as "franken-monarchs".

== Threats ==
In February 2015, the United States Fish and Wildlife Service (USFWS) reported a study that showed that nearly a billion monarchs had vanished from the butterfly's overwintering sites since 1990. The agency attributed the monarch's decline partly to a loss of milkweed caused by herbicides that farmers and homeowners had used.

A 2017 report included mention of the new ethanol-in-gasoline standards as reducing the amount of acreage left fallow in the U.S. midwest: "Federal policies such as the Ethanol Fuel Standards (Renewable Fuel Standard), crop insurance, and waning Farm Bill support for the Conservation Reserve Program (CRP) reduce support for integrated agro-ecological landscapes capable of sustaining both food production and monarch habitat, principally because these policies promote row crops over mixed, herbaceous perennial vegetation."

In 2018, a study correlated monarch butterfly decline to the fact that 95% of corn and soybean crops grown in the United States used genetically modified seeds resistant to the herbicide glyphosate. This meant that instead of spreading the herbicide only before seed planting, farmers could spread the herbicide a second time by air when weeds had begun to challenge the crops. Air application of the herbicide meant that the unplowed margins between the field and road that previously supported milkweed and a range of nectar flowers were now greatly diminished.

By 2024, the USFWS calculated that the eastern butterflies had declined by approximately 80 percent since the 1980s. The western population was more imperiled, declining by 95 percent. According to the USFWS, the species faces a host of threats, including the loss and degradation of its breeding, migratory, and overwintering habitats, exposure to insecticides, and the growing impacts of climate change.

=== Western monarch population ===
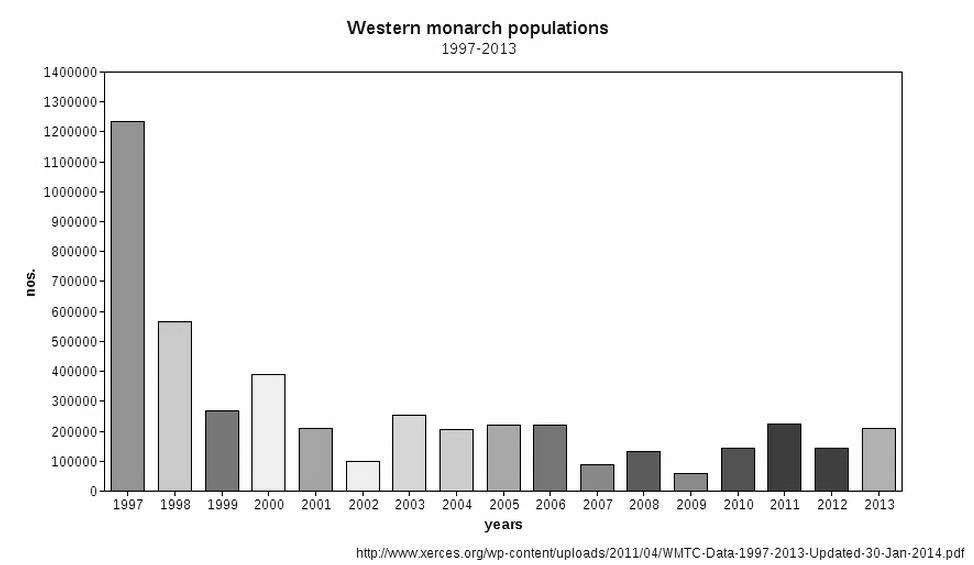
Western monarch populations from 1997 to 2013 (from Xerces Society data)

Based on a 2014 20-year comparison, the overwintering numbers west of the Rocky Mountains have dropped more than 50% since 1997 and the overwintering numbers east of the Rockies have declined by more than 90% since 1995. According to the Xerces Society for Invertebrate Conservation, the monarch population in California decreased by 86% in 2018, going from millions to tens of thousands of butterflies.

The society's annual winter counts have shown a significant decline in the California population. The three lowest counts in the program's history have all occurred in recent years: 1,901 individual monarchs in 2020, 9,119 in 2024, and 12,260 in 2025. One Pacific Grove site had no monarch butterflies in 2020. A primary explanation for this was the destruction of the butterfly's milkweed habitats.

=== Eastern and midwestern monarch populations ===
The number of monarchs overwintering in Mexico has shown a long-term downward trend. Since 1995, coverage numbers have been as high as 18 hectares (44 acres) during the winter of 1996–1997, but on average about 6 hectares (15 acres). Coverage declined to its lowest point to date (0.67 hectares (1.66 acres)) during the winter of 2013–2014, but rebounded to 4.01 hectares (10 acres) in 2015–2016. The average population of monarchs in 2016 was estimated at 200 million. Historically, on average there are 300 million monarchs. The 2016 increase was attributed to favorable breeding conditions in the summer of 2015. However, coverage declined by 27% to 2.91 hectares (7.19 acres) during the winter of 2016–2017. Some believe this was because of a storm that had occurred during March 2016 in the monarchs' previous overwintering season. However, this seems unlikely since most current research shows that the overwintering colony sizes do not predict the size of the next summer breeding population.

A 2016 study attributed the previous decade's 90% decline in overwintering numbers of the eastern monarch population primarily to the loss of breeding habitat and milkweed. The publication's authors stated that an 11%–57% probability existed that this population will become "quasi-extinct" over the next 20 years (i.e. unable to sustain a stable population). Other threats identified in the study include climate change, insecticides, and disease.

Monarchs wintering in central Mexico's forests in 2024-2025 occupied 1.79 hectares (4.42 acres), almost doubling the 0.90 hectares (2.22 acres) occupied during the previous winter. Scientists found that monarchs occupied 2.93 hectares (7.24 acres) of Mexican forest during the winter of 2025-2026, a 64% increase over the previous winter.

Chip Taylor, the director of Monarch Watch at the University of Kansas, stated in 2013 that the Midwest milkweed habitat "is virtually gone" with 120–150 million acres lost. However, he predicted in 2024 that in the immediate future and perhaps into the next two decades, the eastern monarch butterfly population will be relatively stable because it is not presently on a continuous downward trend as it was from 2000-2006. To help fight the population decline, Monarch Watch encourages the planting of "Monarch Waystations".

==== Habitat loss due to herbicide use and genetically modified crops ====
Declines in milkweed abundance and monarch populations between 1999 and 2010 are correlated with the adoption of herbicide-tolerant genetically modified (GM) corn and soybeans, which now constitute 89% and 94% of these crops, respectively, in the U.S. GM corn and soybeans are resistant to the effect of the herbicide glyphosate. Some conservationists attribute the disappearance of milkweed to agricultural practices in the Midwest, where GM seeds are bred to resist herbicides that farmers use to kill unwanted plants that grow near their rows of food crops.

In 2015, the Natural Resources Defense Council filed a suit against the United States Environmental Protection Agency (EPA). The Council argued that the agency ignored warnings about the dangers of glyphosate usage for monarchs. However, a 2018 study has suggested that the decline in milkweed predates the arrival of GM crops.

==== Losses during migration ====
Eastern and midwestern monarchs are experiencing problems reaching Mexico. Many monarch researchers have cited recent evidence from long-term citizen science data that shows that the number of breeding (adult) monarchs has not declined in the last two decades.

The lack of long-term declines in the numbers of breeding and migratory monarchs, yet the clear declines in overwintering numbers, suggests a growing disconnect exists between these life stages. One researcher has suggested that mortality from car strikes constitutes an increasing threat to migrating monarchs. A study of road mortality in northern Mexico, published in 2019, showed very high mortality from just two "hotspots" each year, amounting to 200,000 monarchs killed.

==== Importance of overwintering habitat ====
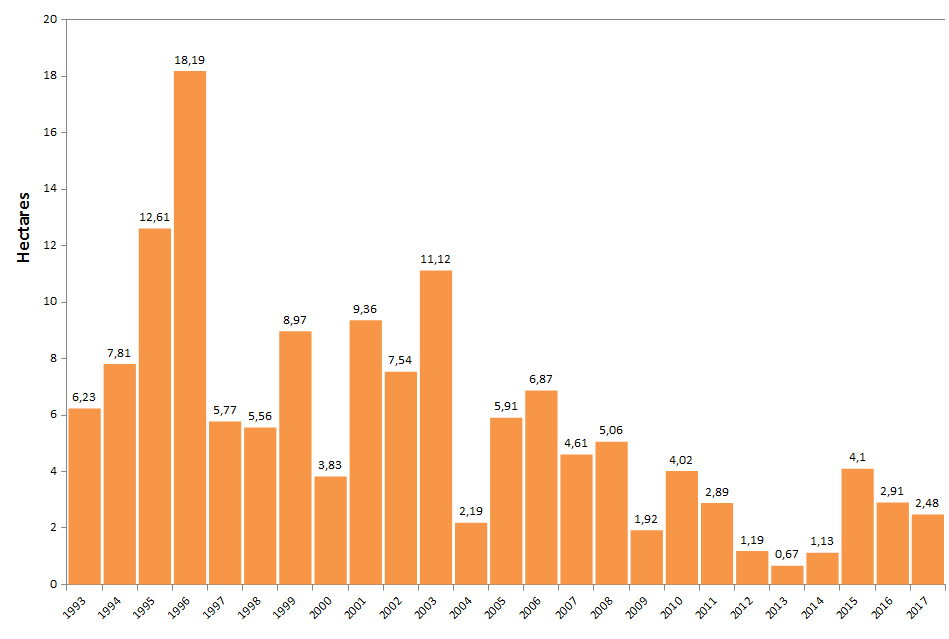
Area covered by monarchs (D. plexippus, eastern migratory population) in their overwintering areas in Mexico between 1993 and 2018

The area of Mexican forest to which eastern and midwestern monarchs migrate reached its lowest level in two decades in 2013. The decline was expected to increase during the 2013–2014 season. Mexican environmental authorities continue to monitor illegal logging of the oyamel fir trees; however, organized criminals have repeatedly crushed such efforts in the name of very short-term financial gain. The oyamel is a major species of evergreen on which the overwintering butterflies spend a significant time during their winter diapause, or suspended development.

A 2014 study acknowledged that while "the protection of overwintering habitat has no doubt gone a long way towards conserving monarchs that breed throughout eastern North America", their research indicates that habitat loss on breeding grounds in the United States is the main cause of recent and projected population declines.

Western monarch populations have rebounded slightly since 2014 with the Western Monarch Thanksgiving Count tallying 335,479 monarchs in 2022. The population still has much to go for a full recovery.

=== Parasites ===
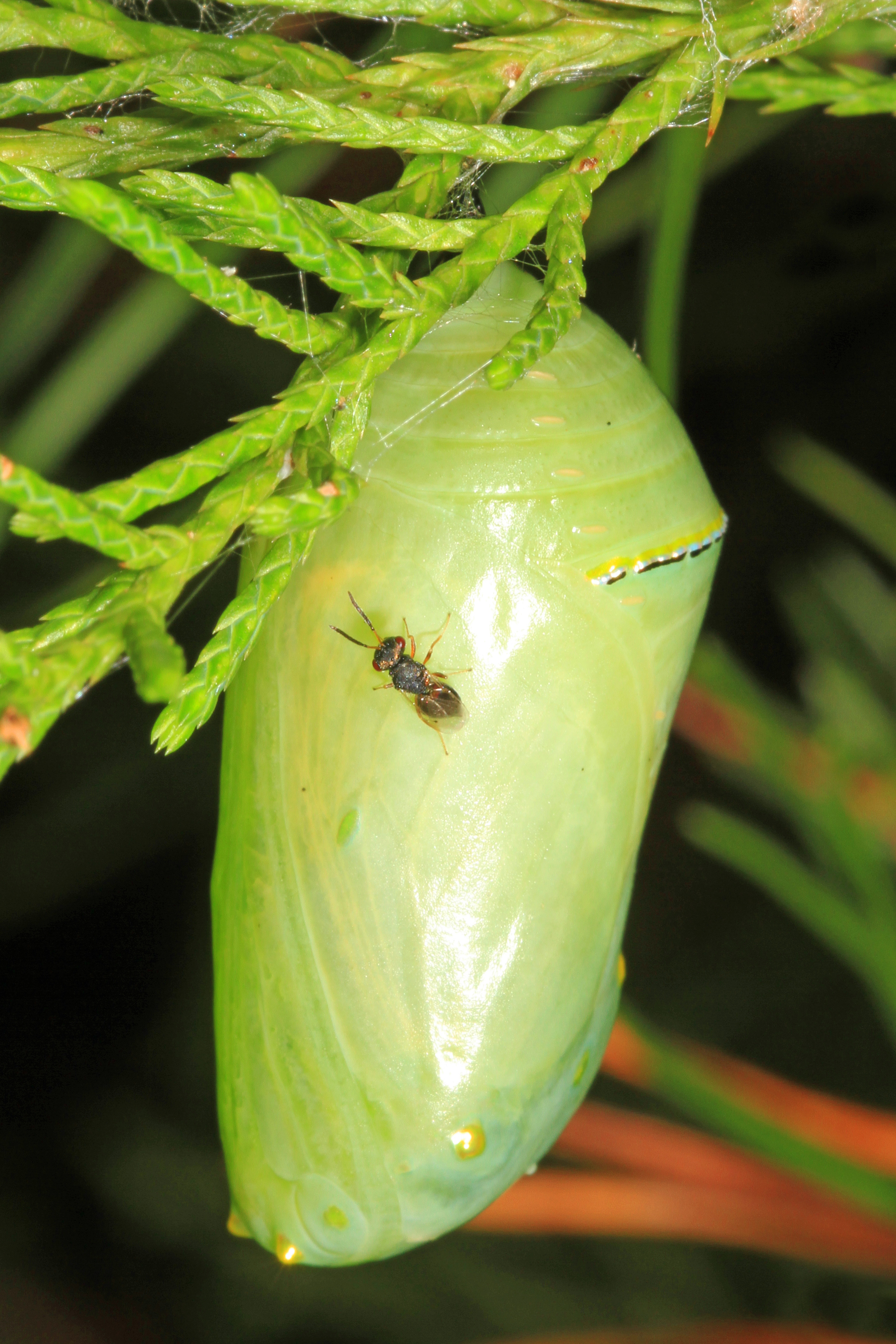
Pteromalus cassotis on monarch chrysalis

Parasites include the tachinid flies Sturmia convergens, Compsilura concinnata, Madremyia saundersii, Hyphantrophaga virilis, Nilea erecta, and Lespesia archippivora. Lespesia-parasitized butterfly larvae suspend, but die prior to pupation. The fly's maggot lowers to the ground, forms a brown puparium, and then emerges as an adult.

Pteromalid wasps, specifically Pteromalus cassotis, parasitize monarch pupae. These wasps lay their eggs in the pupae while the chrysalis is still soft. Up to 400 adults emerge from the chrysalis after 14–20 days, killing the monarch.

The bacterium Micrococcus flacidifex danai also infects larvae. Just before pupation, the larvae migrate to a horizontal surface and die a few hours later, attached only by one pair of prolegs, with the thorax and abdomen hanging limp. The body turns black shortly thereafter. The bacterium Pseudomonas aeruginosa has no invasive powers, but causes secondary infections in weakened insects. It is a common cause of death in laboratory-reared insects.

Ophryocystis elektroscirrha is another parasite of the monarch. It infects the subcutaneous tissues and propagates by spores formed during the pupal stage. The spores are found over all of the bodies of infected butterflies, with the greatest number on the abdomen. These spores are passed, from female to caterpillar, when spores rub off during egg laying and are then ingested by caterpillars. Severely infected individuals are weak, unable to expand their wings, or unable to eclose, and have shortened lifespans, but parasite levels vary in populations. This is not the case in laboratory rearing, where after a few generations, all individuals can be infected.

Infection with O. elektroscirrha creates an effect known as culling, whereby migrating monarchs that are infected are less likely to complete the migration. This results in overwintering populations with lower parasite loads. Owners of commercial butterfly-breeding operations claim that they take steps to control this parasite in their practices, although this claim is doubted by many scientists who study monarchs.

=== Confusion of host plants ===
The black swallow-wort (Cynanchum louiseae) and pale swallow-wort (Cynanchum rossicum) plants are problematic for monarchs in North America. Monarchs lay their eggs on these relatives of native vining milkweed (Cynanchum laeve) because they produce stimuli similar to milkweed. Once the eggs hatch, the caterpillars are poisoned by the toxicity of this invasive plant from Europe.

=== Climate ===
Climate variations during the fall and summer affect butterfly reproduction. Rainfall and freezing temperatures affect milkweed growth. Omar Vidal, director general of WWF-Mexico, said, "The monarch's lifecycle depends on the climatic conditions in the places where they breed. Eggs, larvae, and pupae develop more quickly in milder conditions. Temperatures above 35 °C (95 °F) can be lethal for larvae, and eggs dry out in hot, arid conditions, causing a drastic decrease in hatch rate." If a monarch's body temperatures is below 30 °C (86 °F), a monarch cannot fly. To warm up, they sit in the sun or rapidly shiver their wings to warm themselves.

Climate change may dramatically affect the monarch migration. A study from 2015 examined the impact of warming temperatures on the breeding range of the monarch and showed that in the next 50 years, the monarch host plant will expand its range further north into Canada and that the monarchs will follow this. While this will expand the breeding locations of the monarch, it will also have the effect of increasing the distance that monarchs must travel to reach their overwintering destination in Mexico, which could result in greater mortality during the migration.

Milkweeds grown at increased temperatures have been shown to contain higher cardenolide concentrations, making the leaves too toxic for the monarch caterpillars. However, these increased concentrations are likely in response to increased insect herbivory, which is also caused by the increased temperatures. Whether increased temperatures make milkweed too toxic for monarch caterpillars when other factors are not present is unknown. Additionally, milkweed grown at carbon dioxide levels of 760 parts per million was found to produce a different mix of the toxic cardenolides, one of which was less effective against monarch parasites.

== Conservation status ==
On July 20, 2022, the International Union for Conservation of Nature added the migratory monarch butterfly (the subspecies common in North America) to its red list as an endangered species. However, a petition in 2023 resulted in its status being changed to "vulnerable".

The monarch butterfly is not listed under the Convention on International Trade in Endangered Species of Wild Fauna and Flora or specifically protected under federal laws in the United States.

On August 14, 2014, the Center for Biological Diversity and the Center for Food Safety petitioned the United States Secretary of the Interior through the USFWS to protect the Danaus plexippus plexippus subspecies of the monarch butterfly as a threatened species under the Endangered Species Act. On December 31, 2014, the USFWS initiated a review of the status of the butterfly to determine whether the petitioned action was warranted, with a due date for the submission of information of March 3, 2015, later extended to December 15, 2020.

On December 17, 2020, the USFWS published in the Federal Register a notice in which it stated that adding the butterfly to the list of threatened and endangered species was "warranted-but-precluded" because budgetary limitations required it to devote its resources to species with higher priorities for listing. The notice stated that the USFWS had 422 12-month petition findings for domestic species yet to be initiated and completed at the beginning of Fiscal Year 2020 (October 1, 2019).

On June 27, 2023, the USFWS published in the Federal Register a Notice of Proposed Rulemaking for a rule that would give the butterfly a listing priority number (LPN) of 8 for adding its species to that list. LPNs range from 1 to 12 (the lower the LPN, the higher the listing priority).

On December 12, 2024, the USFWS published in the Federal Register a proposed rule that would list the monarch butterfly (Danaus plexippus) as a threatened species and would designate the butterfly's critical habitat per the provisions of the Endangered Species Act. The USFWS estimated in the proposed rule that the probability of extinction in the foreseeable future (60 years) is 56-74 percent for the eastern monarch migratory population and 99 percent for the western migratory population. The proposed rule designated seven areas near California's Pacific coast as "critical habitat units" for monarch butterflies. The USFWS accepted comments on the proposed rule until March 12, 2025. On March 19, 2025, the USFWS reopened the comment period on the proposed rule until May 19, 2025.

In December 2023, the Government of Canada listed the monarch as an endangered species under the federal Species at Risk Act. The listing protects the butterfly on Canadian federal lands by making it illegal to kill, hurt, catch or remove a monarch egg, caterpillar, chrysalis or adult when on land that the Canadian federal government owns and/or administers. These include Canadian national parks, national wildlife areas, military bases and First Nations reserves. It is also illegal to possess, collect, buy, sell, or trade an individual monarch or any part or derivative of an individual when on that land. The Canadian government must prepare a recovery strategy and one or more action plans for the species to outline the work that can be done to conserve the species. The strategy must identify the critical habitat necessary for the monarch to survive and recover in Canada.

In Ontario, Canada, the monarch butterfly is listed as a species of special concern. In Nova Scotia, the monarch is listed as endangered at the provincial level, as of 2017. This decision (as well as the Ontario decision) is based on a presumption that the overwintering colony declines in Mexico create declines in the breeding range in Canada. Two recent studies have been conducted examining long-term trends in monarch abundance in Canada, using either butterfly atlas records or citizen science butterfly surveys, and neither shows evidence of a population decline in Canada.

== Conservation efforts ==
Although the numbers of breeding monarchs in eastern North America have not decreased, reports of declining numbers of overwintering butterflies have inspired efforts to conserve the species.

=== Federal actions ===
On June 20, 2014, President Barack Obama issued a presidential memorandum entitled "Creating a Federal Strategy to Promote the Health of Honey Bees and Other Pollinators". The memorandum established a Pollinator Health Task Force, to be co-chaired by the Secretary of Agriculture and the Administrator of the Environmental Protection Agency, and stated:

The number of migrating Monarch butterflies sank to the lowest recorded population level in 2013–14, and there is an imminent risk of failed migration.

The U.S. General Services Administration (GSA) publishes sets of landscape performance requirements in its P100 documents, which mandate standards for the GSA's Public Buildings Service. Beginning in March 2015, those performance requirements and their updates have included four primary aspects for planting designs that are intended to provide adequate on-site foraging opportunities for targeted pollinators. The targeted pollinators include bees, butterflies, and other beneficial insects.

In May 2015, the Pollinator Health Task Force issued a "National Strategy to Promote the Health of Honey Bees and Other Pollinators". The strategy laid out federal actions to achieve three goals, two of which were:

- Monarch Butterflies: Increase the Eastern population of the monarch butterfly to 225 million butterflies occupying an area of approximately 15 acres (6.1 hectares) in the overwintering grounds in Mexico, through domestic/international actions and public-private partnerships, by 2020.
- Pollinator Habitat Acreage: Restore or enhance 7 million acres of land for pollinators over the next 5 years through Federal actions and public/private partnerships.

Many of the priority projects that the National Strategy identified focused on the I-35 corridor, which extends for 1,500 miles (2,400 km) from Texas to Minnesota. The area through which that highway travels provides spring and summer breeding habitats in the United States' key monarch migration corridor.

The Task Force simultaneously issued a "Pollinator Research Action Plan". The Plan outlined five main action areas, covered in ten subject-specific chapters. The action areas were: (1) Setting a Baseline; (2) Assessing Environmental Stressors; (3) Restoring Habitat; (4) Understanding and Supporting Stakeholders; (5) Curating and Sharing Knowledge.

In May 2015, the U.S. Department of Agriculture (USDA) and the U.S. Department of the Interior (USDI) issued a 52-page document entitled "Pollinator-Friendly Best Management Practices for Federal Lands". The document consolidated general information about the practices and procedures to use when considering pollinator needs in project development and management of Federal lands that are managed for native diversity and multiple uses. The document also contained a series of actions to be considered when determining those lands best suited for restoration and rehabilitation of monarch habitat. These included an assurance that native wildflowers are available, diverse, and abundant to provide nectar for monarchs and an assurance that milkweed species that female monarchs prefer for egg laying are available or will be planted. The document identified those milkweed species for each of seven regions within the United States.

On December 4, 2015, President Obama signed into law the Fixing America's Surface Transportation (FAST) Act (Pub. L. 114-94). The FAST Act placed a new emphasis on efforts to support pollinators. To accomplish this, the FAST Act amended Title 23 (Highways) of the United States Code. The amendment directed the United States Secretary of Transportation when carrying out programs under that title in conjunction with willing states, to:

1. encourage integrated vegetation management practices on roadsides and other transportation rights-of-way, including reduced mowing; and
2. encourage the development of habitat and forage for Monarch butterflies, other native pollinators, and honey bees through plantings of native forbs and grasses, including noninvasive, native milkweed species that can serve as migratory way stations for butterflies and facilitate migrations of other pollinators.

The FAST Act also stated that activities to establish and improve pollinator habitat, forage, and migratory way stations may be eligible for Federal funding if related to transportation projects funded under Title 23.

In February 2016, the Office of the U.S. Secretary of the Interior issued a memorandum containing an attachment entitled "Strategy for Implementing Pollinator-Friendly Landscaping Design and Maintenance at Department of the Interior Sites". The attachment described specific actions that would address the incorporation of pollinator-friendly landscaping design and maintenance into new construction and major renovations, existing sites, contracts, leases and occupancy agreements, and education/outreach programs. The memorandum containing the attachment directed the USDI's bureaus and offices (which include the Fish and Wildlife Service, the Bureau of Land Management, and the National Park Service) to implement those actions to the extent that they are appropriate for and consistent with, the mission and function of the facility/site.

In June 2016, the Pollinator Health Task Force issued a "Pollinator Partnership Action Plan". That Plan provided examples of past, ongoing, and possible future collaborations between the federal government and non-federal institutions to support pollinator health under each of the National Strategy's goals.

The USDA's Farm Service Agency helps increase U.S. populations of the monarch butterfly and other pollinators through its Conservation Reserve Program's State Acres for Wildlife Enhancement (SAFE) Initiative. The SAFE Initiative provides an annual rental payment to farmers who agree to remove environmentally sensitive land from agricultural production and plant species that will improve environmental health and quality. Among other things, the initiative encourages landowners to establish wetlands, grasses, and trees to create habitats for species that the USFWS has designated to be threatened or endangered.

As part of its targeted monarch butterfly effort, the USDA's Natural Resources Conservation Service (NRCS) works with agricultural producers in the midwest and southern Great Plains to combat the decline of monarch butterflies by planting milkweed and other nectar-rich plants on private lands. The NRCS also provides region-specific guides and plant lists that support populations of monarch butterflies and other pollinators in the Greater Appalachian Mountains Region, the Midwest Region, the Northern and Southern Great Plains, the Southern High Plains and the Western Coastal Plain.

In January 2024, staff of the National Capital Planning Commission (the federal government's planning agency for the National Capital Region) introduced a "Pollinator Best Practices Resource Guide". The Guide summarizes existing federal guidance from the Council on Environmental Quality, the USDA, and the GSA regarding best practices for creating pollinator habitats in both meadow and non-meadow/designed landscapes. When discussing milkweeds, the Guide states that although more than 100 species of such plants are considered native to North America, Asclepias syriaca, or common milkweed, stands out and "is clearly an important species that is critical to the survival of monarch butterflies".

=== Other actions ===
Agriculture companies and other organizations are being asked to set aside unsprayed areas to allow monarchs to breed. In addition, national and local initiatives are underway to help establish and maintain pollinator habitats along corridors containing power lines and roadways. The Federal Highway Administration, state governments, and local jurisdictions are encouraging highway departments and others to limit their use of herbicides, to reduce mowing, to help milkweed to grow, and to encourage monarchs to reproduce within their right-of-ways.

==== State and local governments ====
A Scientific Collecting Permit (SCP) is required to handle wild monarchs in California including for educational purposes. It is unlawful to collect, remove from the wild and/or captively rear monarchs in that state without an SCP.

As of June 2025, at least 14 states (California, Connecticut, Illinois, Kentucky, Maryland, Massachusetts, Minnesota, Missouri, New Jersey, New Mexico, New York, North Carolina, Ohio, Vermont and Washington) had enacted legislation to protect, develop and restore habitat suitable for pollinators. For example, the New Jersey General Assembly considered legislation in 2014 that was intended to increase the monarch butterfly's migrating population within the state. New Jersey's government subsequently approved legislation in May 2017 that established an "Integrated Roadside Vegetation Management Program". Among other things, the legislation required the state's transportation department to develop and adopt a plan for "cost effective maintenance and planting along roadsides, with an emphasis on adaptable vegetation with long life cycles, native vegetation, and wildflowers".

In January 2018, the New Jersey government approved an "Adopt a Monarch Butterfly Waystation Act" and a "Milkweed for Monarchs Act". The latter act required the state's environmental protection department to establish criteria for the planting of milkweed in stormwater management basins on state-owned lands and to take related actions.

In June 2019, Tennessee's transportation department announced a partnership with the state's environment and conservation and agriculture departments to promote pollinator health and awareness in the state's parks. The partners expected to install pollinator meadows and interpretive signage in nine such parks.

Virginia's wildlife resources department encourages plantings of native species that are highly beneficial to pollinators. These include forbs such as Asclepias spp. (milkweeds), Pycnanthemum spp. (mountain mints), those in the Asteraceae family (which includes Coreopsis spp.), Helianthus spp. (sunflowers), Rudbeckia spp. (coneflowers), Solidago spp. (goldenrods), and Eutrochium spp. (Joe-Pye weeds), as well as shrubs such as Prunus americana (American plum), Cercis spp. (redbuds), Vaccinium spp. (blueberries), and Samubucus spp. (elderberries).

In April 2025, the Chicago Park District's general superintendent launched "Project Monarch", a citywide initiative to conserve and celebrate monarch butterflies and their habitats. In addition, many local jurisdictions throughout the United States have made commitments to increase monarch habitat by joining "Monarch City USA" or by taking the National Wildlife Federation's "Mayors' Monarch Pledge" and planting native milkweeds and other nectar plants within their boundaries.

Many cities, towns, counties, and communities have joined "Bee City USA" (an initiative of the Xerces Society for Invertebrate Conservation) and made commitments to conserve native bees, butterflies and other pollinators by increasing the abundance of native plants, providing nesting sites, and reducing the use of pesticides. Molesting or interfering in any way with monarch butterflies during their annual migratory visit to the city of Pacific Grove, California, carries a fine of $1,000 except under defined circumstances.

==== National Cooperative Highway Research Program report ====
In 2020, the National Cooperative Highway Research Program (NCHRP) of the Transportation Research Board issued a 208-page report that described a project that had examined the potential for roadway corridors to provide habitat for monarch butterflies. A part of the project developed tools for roadside managers to optimize potential habitats for monarch butterflies in their road rights-of-way.

Such efforts are controversial because the risk of butterfly mortality near roads is high. Several studies have shown that motor vehicles kill millions of monarchs and other butterflies annually. Also, some evidence indicates that monarch larvae living near roads experience physiological stress conditions, as evidenced by elevations in their heart rate.

The NCHRP report acknowledged that, among other hazards, roads present a danger of traffic collisions for monarchs, stating that these effects appear to be more concentrated in particular funnel areas during migration. Nevertheless, the report concluded:

In summary, threats along roadway corridors exist for monarchs and other pollinators, but in the context of the amount of habitat needed for recovery of sustainable populations, roadsides are of vital importance.

=== Butterfly gardening and monarch waystations ===
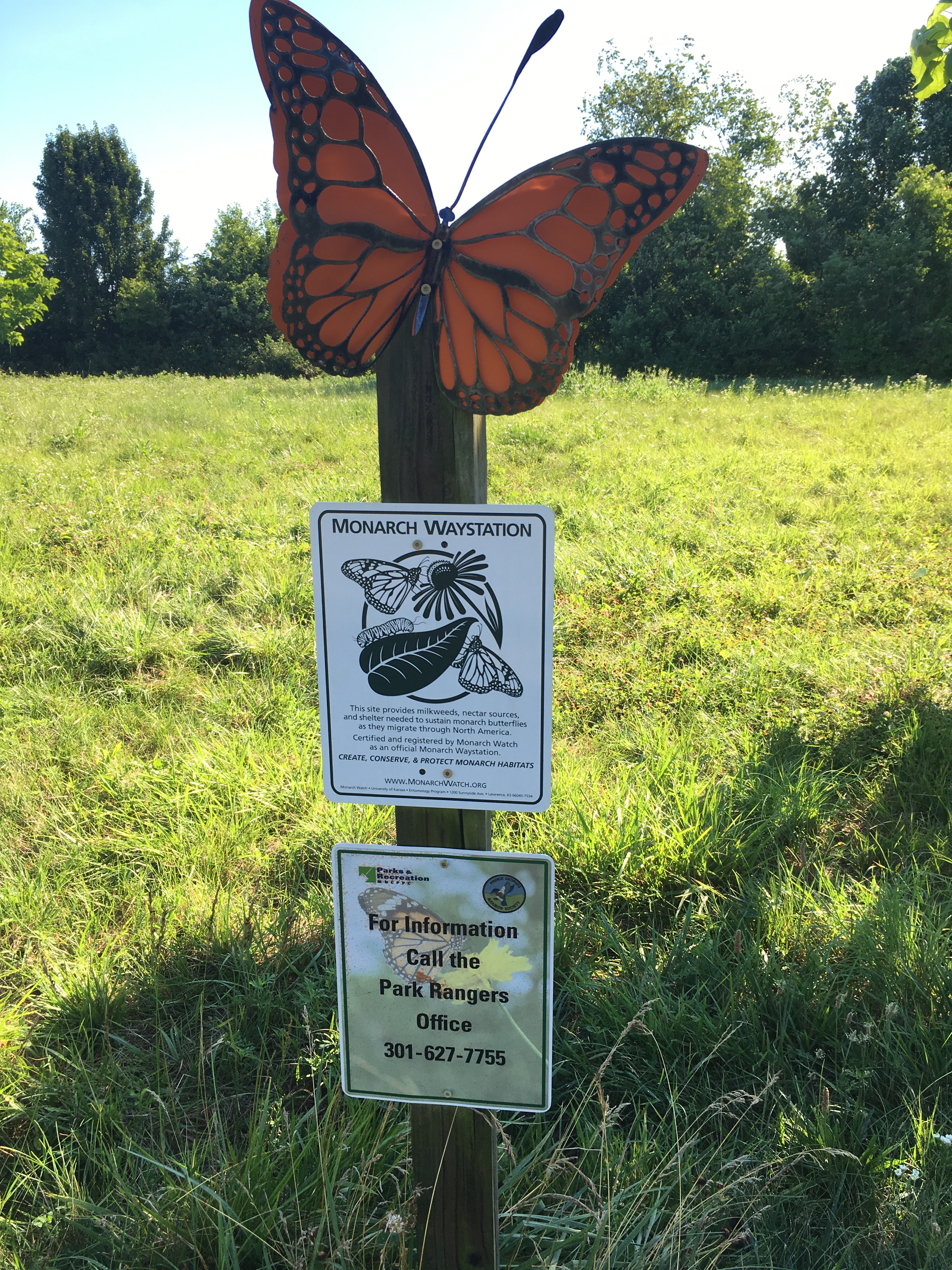
A monarch waystation near the town of Berwyn Heights in Prince George's County, Maryland (June 2017)

The practice of butterfly gardening and creating "monarch waystations" is commonly thought to increase the populations of butterflies. Efforts to restore falling monarch populations by establishing butterfly gardens and monarch waystations require particular attention to the butterfly's food preferences and population cycles, as well to the conditions needed to propagate and maintain milkweed.

For example, in the Washington, D.C., area and elsewhere in the northeastern and midwestern United States, common milkweed (Asclepias syriaca) is among the most important food plants for monarch caterpillars. Within its range it can be found in a broad array of habitats from croplands to pastures, roadsides, ditches and old fields. The plant typically grows to a height of 3-5 feet (0.9-1.5 m), but can reach 8 feet (2.4 m) in ditches and gardens. A USDA conservation planting guide for Maryland recommends that, for optimum wildlife and pollinator habitat in mesic sites, a seed mix containing 30 seeds for each square foot of planting area should have 17.0% A. syriaca by weight and 6.0% by seed.

However, monarchs prefer to lay eggs on A. syriaca when its foliage is soft and fresh. Because monarch reproduction peaks in those areas during the late summer when milkweed foliage is old and tough, A. syriaca needs to be mowed or cut back in June through August to ensure that it will be regrowing rapidly when monarch reproduction reaches its peak. Similar conditions exist for showy milkweed (A. speciosa) in Michigan and for green antelopehorn milkweed (A. viridis), where it grows in the Southern Great Plains and the Western United States. Further, the seeds of A. syriaca and some other milkweeds need periods of cold treatment (cold stratification) before they will germinate.

To protect seeds from washing away during heavy rains and from seed-eating birds, one can cover the seeds with a light fabric or with an 0.5-inch (13 mm) layer of straw mulch. However, mulch acts as an insulator. Thicker layers of mulch can prevent seeds from germinating if they prevent soil temperatures from rising enough when winter ends. Further, few seedlings can push through a thick layer of mulch.

Although monarch caterpillars will feed on butterfly weed (A. tuberosa) in butterfly gardens, it is typically not a heavily used host plant for the species. The plant has rough leaves and a layer of trichomes, which may inhibit oviposition or decrease a female's ability to sense leaf chemicals. The plant's low levels of cardenolides may also deter monarchs from laying eggs on the plant. While A. tuberosa's colorful flowers provide nectar for many adult butterflies, the plant may be less suitable for use in butterfly gardens and monarch waystations than are other milkweed species.

Breeding monarchs prefer to lay eggs on swamp milkweed (A. incarnata) in the midwest. However, A. incarnata is an early successional plant that usually grows at the margins of wetlands and in seasonally flooded areas. The plant is slow to spread via seeds, does not spread by runners, and tends to disappear as vegetative densities increase and habitats dry out. Although A. incarnata plants can survive up to 20 years, most live only two to five years in gardens. The species is not shade-tolerant and is not a good vegetative competitor.

== See also ==
- Butterfly house
- Lepidoptera migration
- Peninsula Point Light, Michigan
