= List of Rhyssomatus species =

This is a list of 189 species in Rhyssomatus, a genus of true weevils in the family Curculionidae.

== Rhyssomatus species ==
- Rhyssomatus aciculaticollis Boheman, 1837^{c}
- Rhyssomatus acutecostatus Champion, 1904^{i c}
- Rhyssomatus aequalis Horn, 1873^{i c b}
- Rhyssomatus aethiops Kirsch, 1875^{c}
- Rhyssomatus alternans Champion, 1904^{c}
- Rhyssomatus amibinus Fiedler, 1937^{c}
- Rhyssomatus angustulus Faust, 1893^{c}
- Rhyssomatus annectans Casey, 1895^{c}
- Rhyssomatus annectens (Casey, 1895)^{i g b}
- Rhyssomatus arizonicus (Van Dyke, 1930)^{i c}
- Rhyssomatus ater Philippi, 1864^{c}
- Rhyssomatus aterrimus Fiedler, 1937^{c}
- Rhyssomatus atrolucens Fiedler, 1937^{c}
- Rhyssomatus atronitens Fiedler, 1937^{c}
- Rhyssomatus atropiceus Fiedler, 1937^{c}
- Rhyssomatus atrorubens Fiedler, 1937^{c}
- Rhyssomatus auropilosus Fiedler, 1937^{c}
- Rhyssomatus auroscutosus Fiedler, 1942^{c}
- Rhyssomatus barioides Fiedler, 1937^{c}
- Rhyssomatus beutenmuelleri (Van Dyke, 1930)^{i c}
- Rhyssomatus bicolor Fiedler, 1937^{c}
- Rhyssomatus bicoloratus Boheman, 1845^{c}
- Rhyssomatus bicoloripennis Fiedler, 1937^{c}
- Rhyssomatus bifasciatus Fiedler, 1937^{c}
- Rhyssomatus biseriatus Champion, 1904^{c}
- Rhyssomatus brevis Fiedler, 1937^{c}
- Rhyssomatus breyeri Brèthes, 1910^{c}
- Rhyssomatus brunneipennis Fiedler, 1937^{c}
- Rhyssomatus brunnescens Fiedler, 1942^{c}
- Rhyssomatus calcarifer Fiedler, 1937^{c}
- Rhyssomatus canaliculatus Fiedler, 1937^{c}
- Rhyssomatus carbonarius Fiedler, 1939^{c}
- Rhyssomatus championi Blackwelder, 1947^{c}
- Rhyssomatus chrysocephalus Fiedler, 1937^{c}
- Rhyssomatus compertus Fiedler, 1937^{c}
- Rhyssomatus contractirostris Fiedler, 1937^{c}
- Rhyssomatus convexus Fiedler, 1939^{c}
- Rhyssomatus crassicollis Fiedler, 1937^{c}
- Rhyssomatus crassirostris Fiedler, 1937^{c}
- Rhyssomatus crenatus Champion, 1904^{c}
- Rhyssomatus crenulatus Blanchard, 1851^{c}
- Rhyssomatus crispicollis Boheman, 1837^{c}
- Rhyssomatus curvatirostris Fiedler, 1937^{c}
- Rhyssomatus debilis Champion, 1904^{c}
- Rhyssomatus difficilis Fiedler, 1939^{c}
- Rhyssomatus dilaticollis Champion, 1904^{c}
- Rhyssomatus discoideus Fiedler, 1939^{c}
- Rhyssomatus diversicollis Heller, 1921^{c}
- Rhyssomatus diversirostris Fiedler, 1937^{c}
- Rhyssomatus dumosus Kuschel, 1955^{c}
- Rhyssomatus ebeninus Suffrian, 1872^{c}
- Rhyssomatus elongatulus Fiedler, 1939^{c}
- Rhyssomatus erythrinus Fiedler, 1937^{c}
- Rhyssomatus erythropterus Fiedler, 1937^{c}
- Rhyssomatus exaratus Blanchard, 1851^{c}
- Rhyssomatus extensus Fiedler, 1939^{c}
- Rhyssomatus fausti Blackwelder, 1947^{c}
- Rhyssomatus ferruginipes Fiedler, 1937^{c}
- Rhyssomatus filirostris Fiedler, 1937^{c}
- Rhyssomatus fissilis Burke, 1961^{i c b}
- Rhyssomatus flavosparsus Fiedler, 1937^{c}
- Rhyssomatus fortirostris Fiedler, 1939^{c}
- Rhyssomatus fulvicornis Fiedler, 1939^{c}
- Rhyssomatus fulvomixtus Fiedler, 1939^{c}
- Rhyssomatus fulvopilosus Fiedler, 1937^{c}
- Rhyssomatus fulvosparsus Fiedler, 1939^{c}
- Rhyssomatus gracilirostris Fiedler, 1937^{c}
- Rhyssomatus granatensis Fiedler, 1937^{c}
- Rhyssomatus grandicollis (Casey, 1895)^{i c}
- Rhyssomatus griseofasciatus Fiedler, 1939^{c}
- Rhyssomatus haemopterus Fiedler, 1939^{c}
- Rhyssomatus impolitus Fiedler, 1937^{c}
- Rhyssomatus impressicollis Fiedler, 1942^{c}
- Rhyssomatus incertus Fiedler, 1939^{c}
- Rhyssomatus iners Fiedler, 1939^{c}
- Rhyssomatus inflexirostris Fiedler, 1939^{c}
- Rhyssomatus landeiroi Bondar, 1942^{c}
- Rhyssomatus languidus Fiedler, 1937^{c}
- Rhyssomatus laticollis Champion, 1904^{c}
- Rhyssomatus latipennis Champion, 1904^{c}
- Rhyssomatus latovalis Fiedler, 1942^{c}
- Rhyssomatus latus Champion, 1904^{c}
- Rhyssomatus lineaticollis (Say, 1824)^{i c b} (milkweed stem weevil)
- Rhyssomatus lineatifrons Fiedler, 1942^{c}
- Rhyssomatus longirostris Chevrolat,^{c}
- Rhyssomatus macilentus Fiedler, 1942^{c}
- Rhyssomatus marginatus Fåhraeus, 1837^{c}
- Rhyssomatus medialis (Casey, 1895)^{i c b}
- Rhyssomatus minutus Kirsch, 1875^{c}
- Rhyssomatus morio Rosenschoeld, 1837^{c}
- Rhyssomatus nigerrimus Fåhraeus, 1837^{c}
- Rhyssomatus nigriventris Fiedler, 1937^{c}
- Rhyssomatus nigropiceus Fiedler, 1937^{c}
- Rhyssomatus nigrosignatus Fiedler, 1937^{c}
- Rhyssomatus nitidus Champion, 1904^{c}
- Rhyssomatus notabilis Fiedler, 1937^{c}
- Rhyssomatus novalis Schoenherr, 1837^{c}
- Rhyssomatus obliquefasciatus Fiedler, 1937^{c}
- Rhyssomatus oblongovalis Fiedler, 1942^{c}
- Rhyssomatus obtusus Fiedler, 1939^{c}
- Rhyssomatus ochraceus Fiedler, 1937^{c}
- Rhyssomatus oculatus (Schaeffer, 1909)^{i c}
- Rhyssomatus opacus Fiedler, 1939^{c}
- Rhyssomatus opimus Fiedler, 1937^{c}
- Rhyssomatus oriformis Fiedler, 1937^{c}
- Rhyssomatus ovalis (Casey, 1892)^{i c b}
- Rhyssomatus ovatulus Fiedler, 1939^{c}
- Rhyssomatus oviformis Fiedler, 1939^{c}
- Rhyssomatus ovipennis Fiedler, 1939^{c}
- Rhyssomatus palmacollis (Say, 1831)^{i c b}
- Rhyssomatus parvidens Fiedler, 1942^{c}
- Rhyssomatus parvulus (Casey, 1895)^{i c b}
- Rhyssomatus patinacollis ^{c}
- Rhyssomatus paululus Fiedler, 1942^{c}
- Rhyssomatus perparvulus Hustache, 1936^{c}
- Rhyssomatus peruvianus Kirsch, 1875^{c}
- Rhyssomatus picinus Fiedler, 1937^{c}
- Rhyssomatus pilosipes Heller, 1921^{c}
- Rhyssomatus pilosus Kissinger, 1962^{c}
- Rhyssomatus pinguis Fiedler, 1937^{c}
- Rhyssomatus polycoccus Fåhraeus, 1837^{c}
- Rhyssomatus productus Fiedler, 1939^{c}
- Rhyssomatus pruinosus (Boheman, 1845)^{i c b}
- Rhyssomatus psidii Marshall, 1929^{c}
- Rhyssomatus pubescens Horn, 1873^{i c b}
- Rhyssomatus pullus Hustache, 1924^{c}
- Rhyssomatus punctatosulcatus Champion, 1904^{c}
- Rhyssomatus puncticollis Champion, 1904^{c}
- Rhyssomatus pupillatus Suffrian, 1872^{c}
- Rhyssomatus pusillus Fiedler, 1937^{c}
- Rhyssomatus rectirostris Fiedler, 1942^{c}
- Rhyssomatus robustus Fiedler, 1939^{c}
- Rhyssomatus rubidus Fiedler, 1937^{c}
- Rhyssomatus rubripennis Fiedler, 1937^{c}
- Rhyssomatus rubrocostatus Fiedler, 1937^{c}
- Rhyssomatus rubrofasciatus Fiedler, 1937^{c}
- Rhyssomatus rubromixtus Fiedler, 1939^{c}
- Rhyssomatus rubropiceus Fiedler, 1939^{c}
- Rhyssomatus rubrovarius Fiedler, 1937^{c}
- Rhyssomatus rudicollis Fiedler, 1937^{c}
- Rhyssomatus rufescens Champion, 1904^{c}
- Rhyssomatus rufinus Fiedler, 1937^{c}
- Rhyssomatus rufipennis Kirsch, 1875^{c}
- Rhyssomatus rufitarsis Roelofs, 1875^{c}
- Rhyssomatus rufulus Fiedler, 1937^{c}
- Rhyssomatus rufus Fåhraeus, 1837^{c}
- Rhyssomatus rugosus Champion, 1904^{c}
- Rhyssomatus rugulipennis Champion, 1904^{i c}
- Rhyssomatus sculpticollis Champion, 1904^{c}
- Rhyssomatus sculpturatus Champion, 1904^{c}
- Rhyssomatus sculpturatus ? Champion, 1902-06 (0^{c}
- Rhyssomatus scupticollis Champion, 1902-06 (0^{c}
- Rhyssomatus scutellaris Fiedler, 1939^{c}
- Rhyssomatus semicostatus Boheman, 1845^{c}
- Rhyssomatus semistriatus Fiedler, 1942^{c}
- Rhyssomatus seriepilosus Fiedler, 1937^{c}
- Rhyssomatus sexcostatus Champion, 1910^{c}
- Rhyssomatus spectatus Faust, 1893^{c}
- Rhyssomatus strangulatus Gyllenhal, 1837^{c}
- Rhyssomatus striatellus Fiedler, 1937^{c}
- Rhyssomatus strigicollis Schoenherr, 1837^{c}
- Rhyssomatus strigosus Fiedler, 1937^{c}
- Rhyssomatus striolatus Fiedler, 1937^{c}
- Rhyssomatus subcostatus Fåhraeus, 1837^{c}
- Rhyssomatus subfasciatus Faust, 1893^{c}
- Rhyssomatus subovalis Fiedler, 1937^{c}
- Rhyssomatus subrhomboidalis Fiedler, 1939^{c}
- Rhyssomatus subrufus Champion, 1904^{c}
- Rhyssomatus substrigosus Fiedler, 1939^{c}
- Rhyssomatus subtilis Fiedler, 1937^{c}
- Rhyssomatus tabescens Scudder, 1893^{c}
- Rhyssomatus tenellus Fiedler, 1942^{c}
- Rhyssomatus tenuifasciatus Fiedler, 1937^{c}
- Rhyssomatus tenuirostris Fiedler, 1937^{c}
- Rhyssomatus tenuistrigatus Fiedler, 1937^{c}
- Rhyssomatus texanus (Sleeper, 1954)^{i g b}
- Rhyssomatus thoracicus Fiedler, 1937^{c}
- Rhyssomatus tomentosus Fiedler, 1939^{c}
- Rhyssomatus totostriatus Fiedler, 1942^{c}
- Rhyssomatus trifasciatus Fiedler, 1937^{c}
- Rhyssomatus tuberculirostris Fiedler, 1942^{c}
- Rhyssomatus umbrinus Fiedler, 1937^{c}
- Rhyssomatus vacillatus Fiedler, 1937^{c}
- Rhyssomatus variegatus Fiedler, 1937^{c}
- Rhyssomatus variipennis Fiedler, 1937^{c}
- Rhyssomatus vehemens Boheman, 1845^{c}
- Rhyssomatus vestitus Fiedler, 1942^{c}
- Rhyssomatus viridipes Fåhraeus, 1837^{c}
- Rhyssomatus yucatanus Champion, 1904^{c}

Data sources: i = ITIS, c = Catalogue of Life, g = GBIF, b = Bugguide.net
