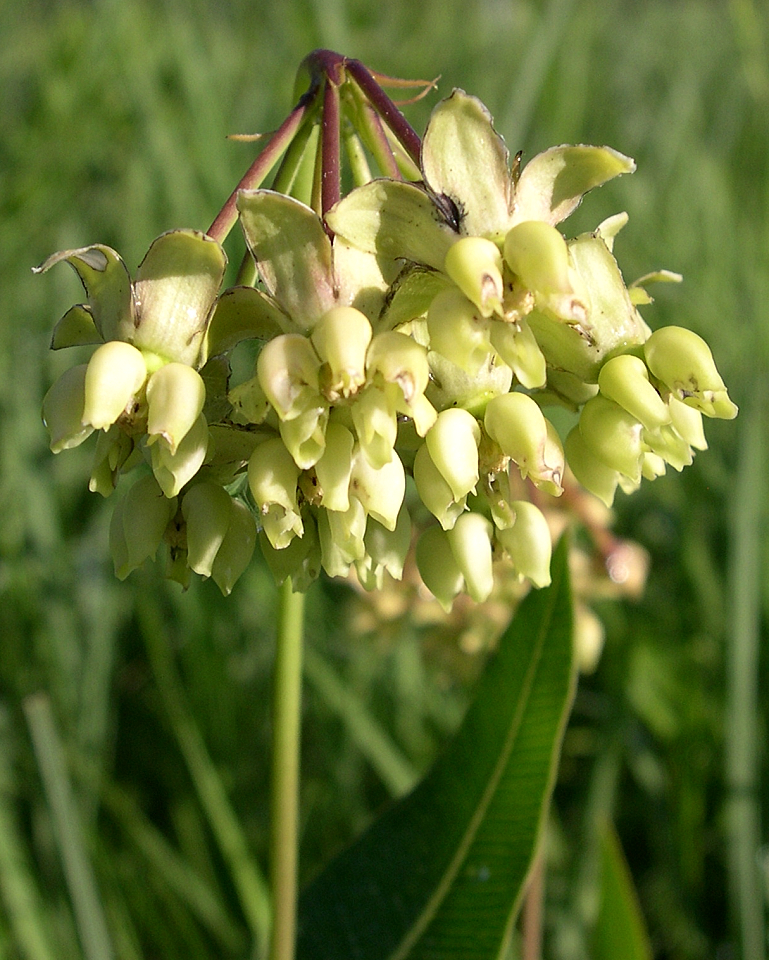

Conservation status
- Imperiled (NatureServe)

Scientific classification
- Kingdom: Plantae
- Clade: Tracheophytes
- Clade: Angiosperms
- Clade: Eudicots
- Clade: Asterids
- Order: Gentianales
- Family: Apocynaceae
- Genus: Asclepias
- Species: A. meadii

Binomial name
- Asclepias meadii Torr. ex A.Gray 1857

= Asclepias meadii =

Species of flowering plant

Asclepias meadii is a rare species of milkweed known by the common name Mead's milkweed. It is native to the American Midwest, where it was probably once quite widespread in the tallgrass prairie. Today much of the Midwest has been fragmented and claimed for agriculture, and the remaining prairie habitat is degraded.

The plant is a federally listed threatened species due to this destruction of its habitat. Factors contributing to its rarity include mowing and plowing, highway expansions, erosion, loss of a natural prairie fire regime, pesticides directly applied or drifting from nearby agricultural operations, invasive plant species, trampling by hikers and off-road vehicles, loss of native insect pollinators, deer herbivory, and predation by a number of insect species, including the non-native oleander aphid.

== Distribution ==
The only naturally occurring populations of the plant are located in Missouri and Illinois, and populations have been reintroduced to Indiana and Wisconsin, where the plant had been extirpated. There are also some populations in Kansas and Iowa, but few of these may last, especially in Kansas, where they occur on private hay fields that are mowed frequently.

Highway expansions have been a source of destruction for the plant and its habitat. In 2019, this issue came to the fore again. A highway expansion will destroy some of the plant's remaining habitat, so ecologists are trying to move the plants, a practice that has, so far, not been effective.

== Description ==
This is a rhizomatous perennial herb with a waxy erect stem growing up to about 40 centimeters tall. Blue-green, herringbone-patterned leaves occur in opposite pairs about the stem. The lance-shaped blades are smooth and sometimes wavy along the edges, and measure up to 8 centimeters long. The inflorescence is a nodding umbel of 6 to 23 fragrant flowers. Each flower has five petals up to a centimeter long which are green or purple-tinged when new and grow paler as they age. Behind them are five reflexed sepals. The flowers are nectar-rich and are pollinated by digger bees (Anthophora spp.), bumblebees (Bombus spp.), and other bees. The fruit is a follicle up to 8 centimeters long containing hairy seeds. The species is long-lived, taking at least four years to reach sexual maturity and living for several decades, possibly over a century.

=== Reproduction ===
The species often reproduces vegetatively by sprouting more stems from its rhizome. It also sometimes reproduces sexually by producing seed. A reduction in genetic diversity is a threat to the species, as it requires diversity for the production of robust offspring. Seeds created via low-diversity fertilization tend to be less viable and produce weaker plants. This species is not self-fertile, either. Human activity has favored vegetative reproduction, a cloning of the plants that does not remix genes. Mowing chops off the flowers or immature fruits, preventing seed production. Fragmentation of the habitat reduces the number of nearby plants that can trade pollen and the likelihood of visits from common pollinating insects.

== Fire ecology ==
The plant is adapted to occasional prairie fire, and the suppression of such fires is detrimental. Fire may have a number of beneficial fire ecology effects on the plant, including increases in leaf and flower production and in genetic diversity.

== Insect ecology ==
Insects that eat the plant include the milkweed beetles Tetraopes femoratus and Tetraopes tetrophthalmus and the milkweed weevils Rhyssomatus annectans and Rhyssomatus lineaticollis. This plant, like many other milkweeds, hosts the monarch butterfly (Danaus plexippus). The non-native oleander aphid, Aphis nerii, greatly weakens milkweed plants by removing sugars from stems and leaves. The leaves yellow and fall away. Flowering and seed production suffer as a result. The aphid often is just one of multiple insect species that weakens a milkweed plant during a season. A species of parasitic wasp has been approved and introduced that feeds specifically on this aphid but it is currently not being sold by any company in North America. The wasp is not widespread as a result of the introduction. Certain other species parasitic wasps that feed on aphids have been observed to sometimes feed on the oleander aphid.

== Mammal herbivory ==
One study's author said that protective cages are necessary for the establishment of transplants in large areas (where fencing is not feasible), due to predation by deer and other animals. Apparently, this milkweed species is low in the toxic cardenolide chemicals that deter animal herbivory. Unfortunately, cages require maintenance that budgets typically do not provide for. Human activity has caused a rise in the population of deer as well as rodents. Rabbits also have the tendency to clip off the tops of seedlings multiple times in a season (leaving the foliage uneaten), often killing them. This behavior can be seen in multiple milkweed species, such as Asclepias syriaca.
