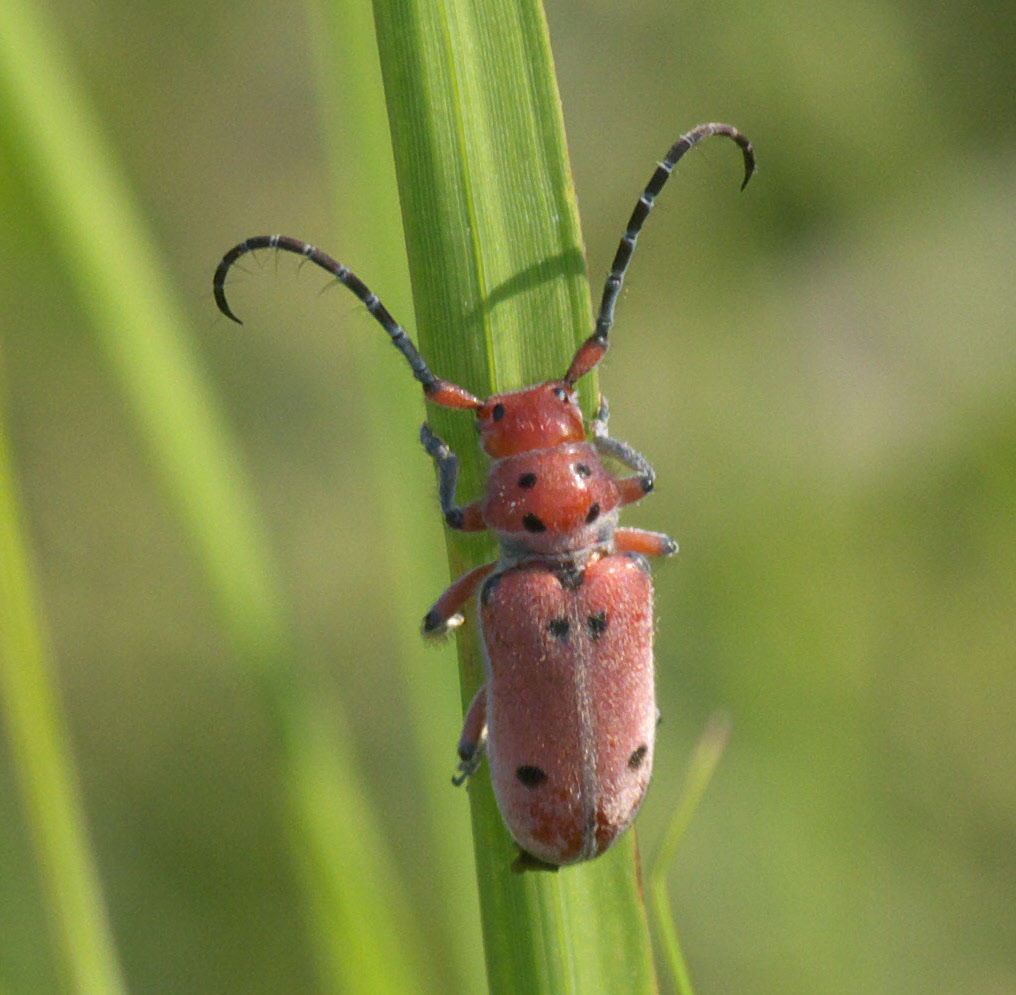

Conservation status
- Near Threatened (IUCN 3.1)

Scientific classification
- Kingdom: Animalia
- Phylum: Arthropoda
- Class: Insecta
- Order: Coleoptera
- Suborder: Polyphaga
- Infraorder: Cucujiformia
- Family: Cerambycidae
- Genus: Tetraopes
- Species: T. texanus

Binomial name
- Tetraopes texanus Horn, 1878

= Tetraopes texanus =

Species of beetle

Tetraopes texanus is a species of beetle in the family Cerambycidae. It was described by George Henry Horn in 1878. It is known from Northern Mexico and the United States. There exist two primary subpopulations of T. texanus - one in Texas and Oklahoma, and one in the Black Belt Prairie of Mississippi and Alabama. There are scattered populations in southeastern Arkansas where it is listed as a species of greatest conservation need. Isolated records of T. texanus exist from glades in Missouri, and prairie remnants in Kansas, these appear to be at the extreme edges of the population range, and may just represent attempts at long-distance dispersal. Like other members of this genus, T. texanus utilizes several milkweed species (Ascelpias) as a host plant, including Asclepias viridis, Asclepias viridiflora, and Asclepias syriaca. Adults emerge in early May and feed and breed through June. Eggs are deposited in grass stems, and upon hatching, larvae drop to the soil where they feed on the roots of milkweed plants. By July in many locations, adults begin to die off for the season, but some adults can be found through the rest of the summer, although typically in very few numbers. Populations of T. texanus can be locally abundant if habitat conditions are suitable and if there is a robust stand of their host plant. This species appears to have an affinity for calcareous grassland soils, and studies suggest this habitat requirement may drive its unique disjunct distribution, although this is still an area of research. A recent IUCN Red List assessment of T. texanus classified the species as 'Near Threatened' due to its relatively limited range, habitat loss, and increasing genetic isolation among populations.
