= Tetraopes submersus =

Scientific classification
- Kingdom: Animalia
- Phylum: Arthropoda
- Class: Insecta
- Order: Coleoptera
- Suborder: Polyphaga
- Infraorder: Cucujiformia
- Family: Cerambycidae
- Genus: Tetraopes
- Species: †T. submersus

Binomial name
- †Tetraopes submersus (Cockerell, 1908)

Synonyms
- Saperda submersa Cockerell, 1908

Species of beetle

Tetraopes submersus is an extinct species of beetle in the family Cerambycidae. It was described by Theodore Dru Alison Cockerell in 1908. It existed in what is now the United States.
