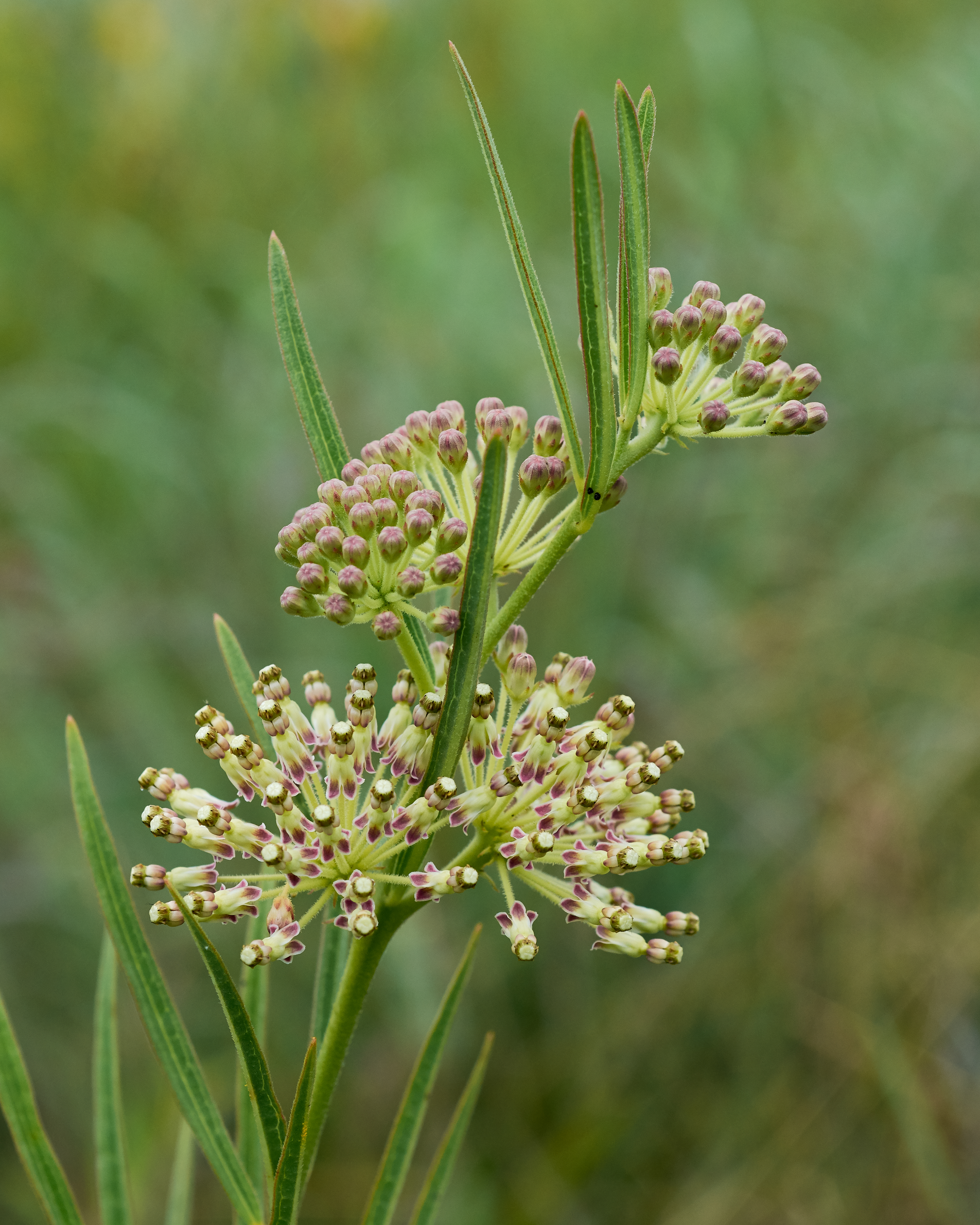

Conservation status
- Secure (NatureServe)

Scientific classification
- Kingdom: Plantae
- Clade: Tracheophytes
- Clade: Angiosperms
- Clade: Eudicots
- Clade: Asterids
- Order: Gentianales
- Family: Apocynaceae
- Genus: Asclepias
- Species: A. hirtella

Binomial name
- Asclepias hirtella (Pennell) Woodson

Synonyms
- Asclepias longifolia ssp. hirtella (Pennell) J.Farmer & C.R.Bell

= Asclepias hirtella =

Species of plant

Asclepias hirtella, commonly called the tall green milkweed, is a species of flowering plant in the milkweed genus and dogbane family (Apocynaceae). It is native to Canada and the United States, where its range is concentrated in the Midwest and Upper South.

== Description ==
Asclepias hirtella is a tall perennial, reaching 3 feet in height. It has many narrow, linear leaves that are produced alternately on the stem. Its flowers in lateral umbels with slender peduncles. Each stem may have 2 to 10 umbels and each umbel may have 30 to 100 flowers. The flowers lack horns and are greenish to slightly purplish in color. It flowers June through August.

This species closely resembles Asclepias longifolia, and it is occasionally treated to be a subspecies of it. Asclepias longifolia is restricted to the Southeastern Coastal Plain, and it differs from Asclepias hirtella in its fewer and smaller flower umbels, and its glabrous leaves.

== Habitat ==
Asclepias hirtella is found in a variety of open habitats, including areas with dry sandy soil, prairies and limestone glades, It can be found in both wet and dry conditions, and it prefers open habitats with full sun. This species is a component of high-quality grassland communities, although it can be found in and disturbed conditions as well. It is considered to be uncommon throughout much of its range.

== Distribution ==
Asclepias hirtella is native to West Virginia, Ohio, Michigan and Wisconsin to northern Iowa, Kansas and Oklahoma to southwestern Kentucky. It is a prairie species native to 13 US states and one Canadian province, but is becoming rare or declining in numbers in parts of its native range. A. hirtella is rare in Minnesota and listed as a threatened species in that state, where it occurs in the south eastern corner in mesic prairie habitats.
