= Phaea mankinsi =

Scientific classification
- Kingdom: Animalia
- Phylum: Arthropoda
- Class: Insecta
- Order: Coleoptera
- Suborder: Polyphaga
- Infraorder: Cucujiformia
- Family: Cerambycidae
- Genus: Phaea
- Species: P. mankinsi

Binomial name
- Phaea mankinsi Chemsak & Linsley, 1979

Synonyms
- Tetraopes mankinsi Chemsak & Linsley, 1979

Species of beetle

Phaea mankinsi is a species of beetle in the family Cerambycidae. It was described by Chemsak and Linsley in 1979. It is known from Honduras and Guatemala.
