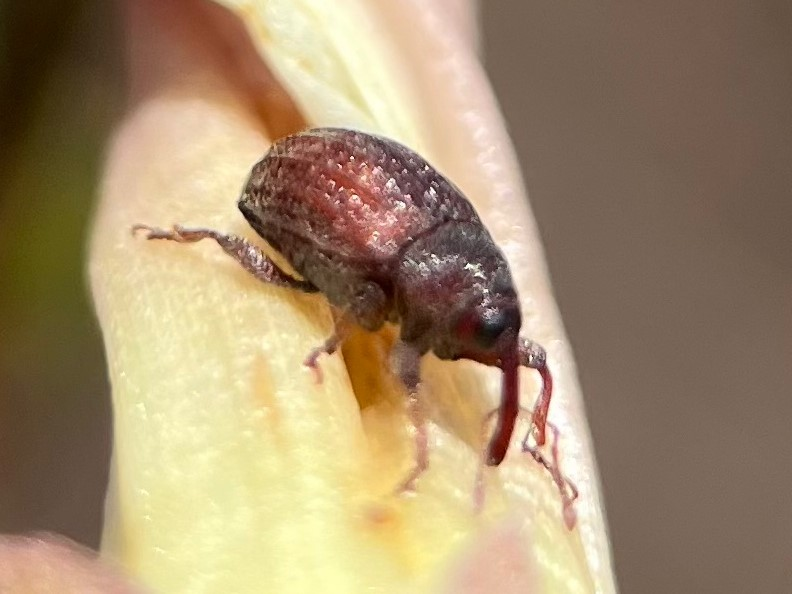

Scientific classification
- Kingdom: Animalia
- Phylum: Arthropoda
- Clade: Pancrustacea
- Class: Insecta
- Order: Coleoptera
- Suborder: Polyphaga
- Infraorder: Cucujiformia
- Superfamily: Curculionoidea
- Family: Curculionidae
- Genus: Rhyssomatus
- Species: R. pubescens

Binomial name
- Rhyssomatus pubescens Horn, 1873

= Rhyssomatus pubescens =

Species of beetle

Rhyssomatus pubescens is a species of true weevil in the beetle family Curculionidae. It is found in North America.
