= Tetraopes discoideus =

Scientific classification
- Kingdom: Animalia
- Phylum: Arthropoda
- Class: Insecta
- Order: Coleoptera
- Suborder: Polyphaga
- Infraorder: Cucujiformia
- Family: Cerambycidae
- Genus: Tetraopes
- Species: T. discoideus

Binomial name
- Tetraopes discoideus LeConte, 1847

Species of beetle

Tetraopes discoideus is a species of beetle in the family Cerambycidae. It was described by John Lawrence LeConte in 1847. It is known from Mexico and the United States.

== Physical Characteristics ==
T. discoideus is significantly smaller than other members of its genus, typically measuring between 7–9 mm in length.

== Life History ==
Adults are typically active for about one month, spending their time resting, feeding, and mating on milkweed plants. Larvae develop by feeding on the roots of the host plant; in species with small roots, they live in the surrounding soil, while in those with large taproots, they may tunnel directly into the root.
