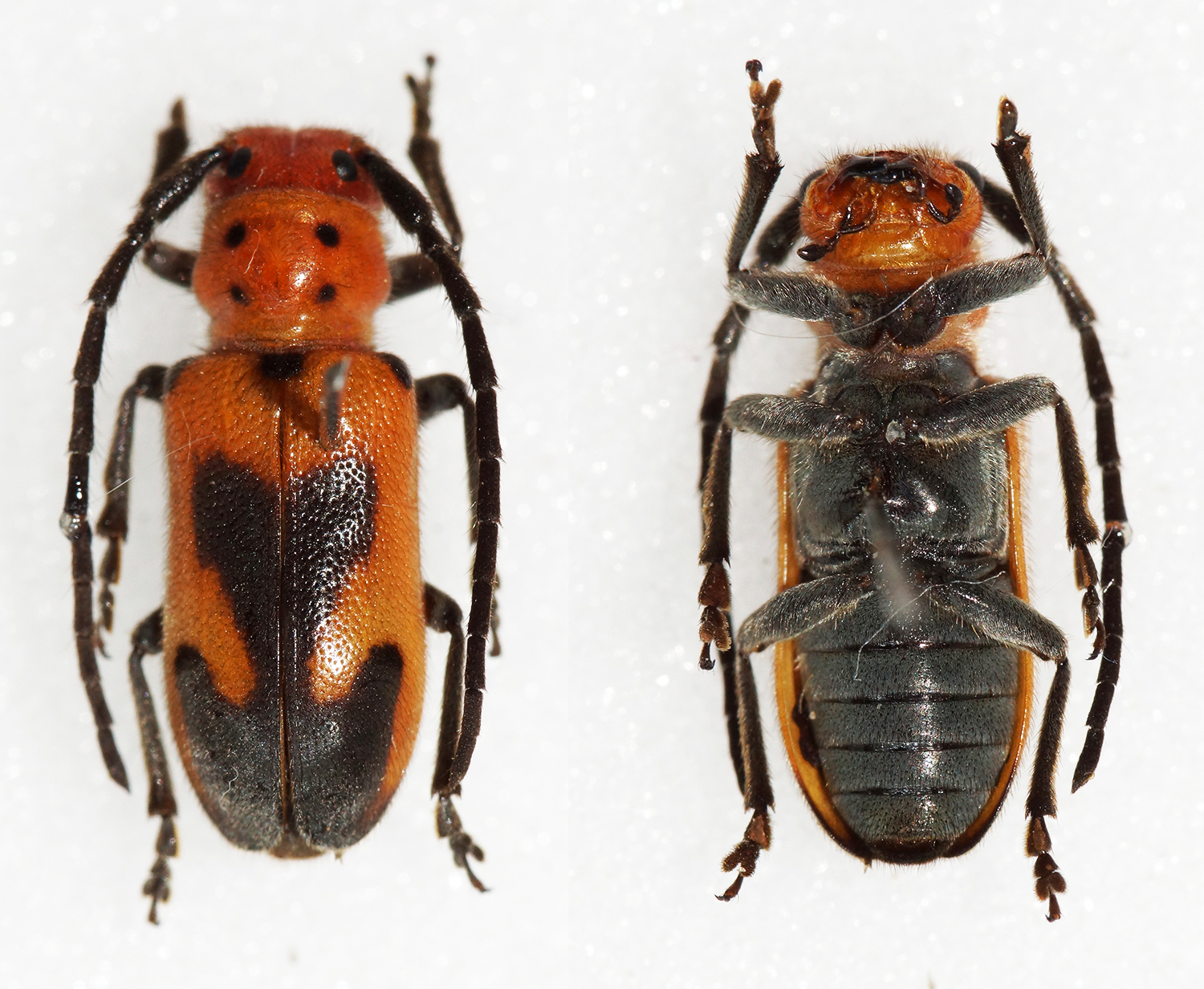

Scientific classification
- Kingdom: Animalia
- Phylum: Arthropoda
- Class: Insecta
- Order: Coleoptera
- Suborder: Polyphaga
- Infraorder: Cucujiformia
- Family: Cerambycidae
- Genus: Tetraopes
- Species: T. melanurus

Binomial name
- Tetraopes melanurus Schoenherr, 1817

= Tetraopes melanurus =

Species of beetle

Tetraopes melanurus is a species of beetle in the family Cerambycidae. It was described by Schoenherr in 1817. It is known from the United States.
