= Phaea carnelia =

Scientific classification
- Kingdom: Animalia
- Phylum: Arthropoda
- Class: Insecta
- Order: Coleoptera
- Suborder: Polyphaga
- Infraorder: Cucujiformia
- Family: Cerambycidae
- Genus: Phaea
- Species: P. carnelia

Binomial name
- Phaea carnelia Chemsak & Linsley, 1988

Species of beetle

Phaea carnelia is a species of beetle in the family Cerambycidae.

== Distribution ==
It was described by Chemsak and Linsley in 1988. It is known from Mexico.
