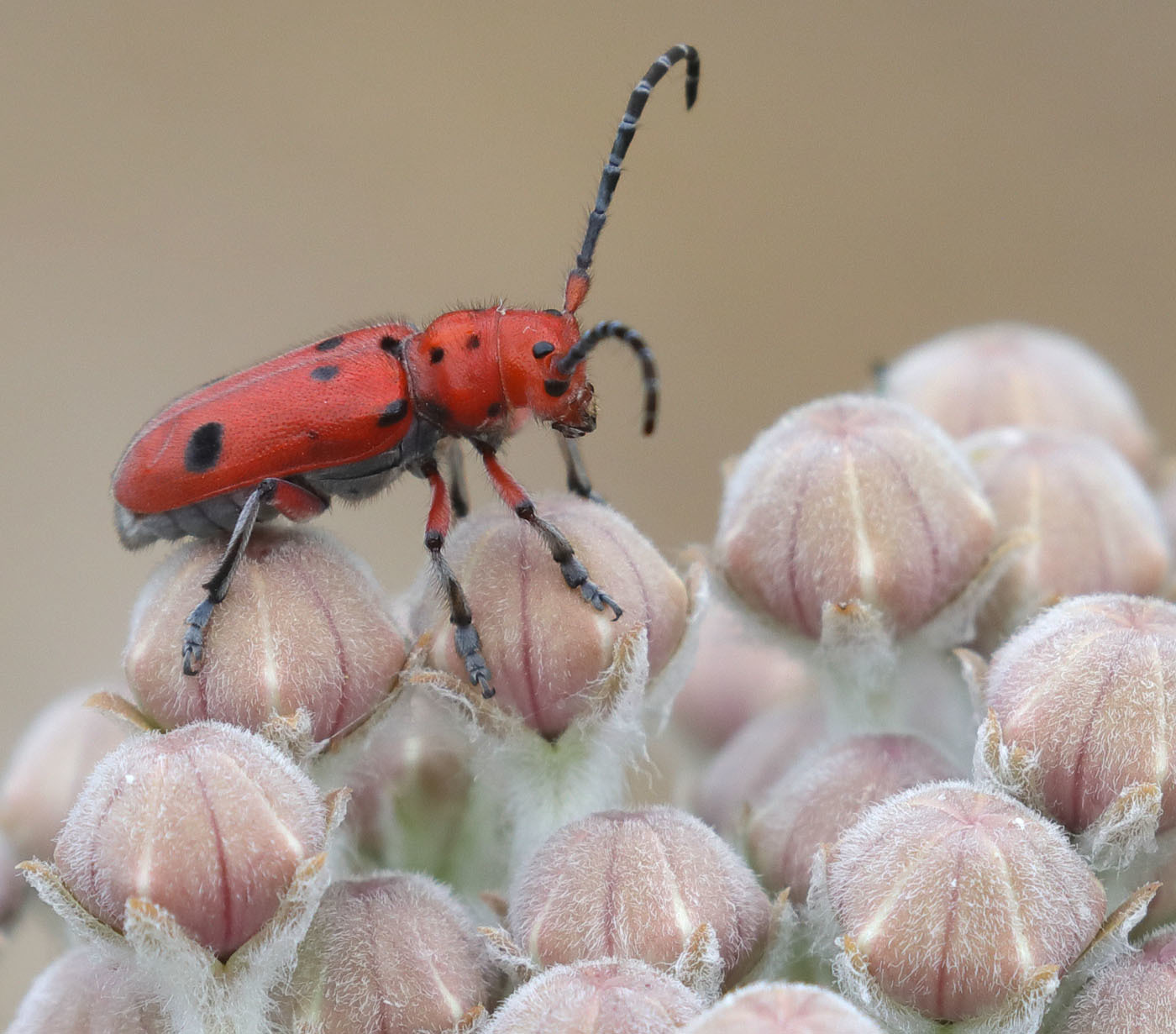
- Photographed by Paul G. Johnson at Pinnacles National Park

Scientific classification
- Kingdom: Animalia
- Phylum: Arthropoda
- Class: Insecta
- Order: Coleoptera
- Suborder: Polyphaga
- Infraorder: Cucujiformia
- Family: Cerambycidae
- Genus: Tetraopes
- Species: T. basalis

Binomial name
- Tetraopes basalis LeConte, 1852

= Tetraopes basalis =

Species of beetle

Tetraopes basalis, also known as the western milkweed longhorn beetle, is a species of beetle in the family Cerambycidae. It was described by John Lawrence LeConte in 1852. It is known from the United States. The western milkweed longhorn beetle is most often seen from April to August, feeding on all parts of its Asclepias host plants. Pupae and larvae live in the soil below the plant.
