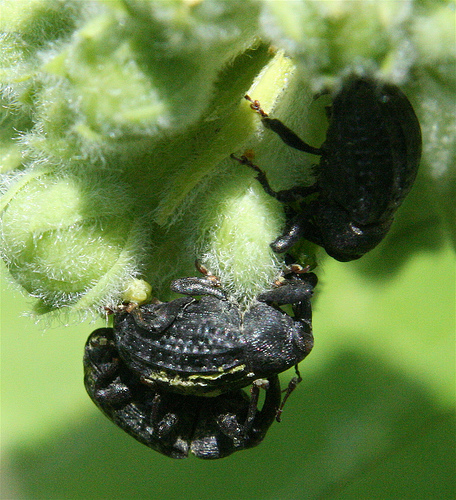

Scientific classification
- Kingdom: Animalia
- Phylum: Arthropoda
- Class: Insecta
- Order: Coleoptera
- Suborder: Polyphaga
- Infraorder: Cucujiformia
- Family: Curculionidae
- Genus: Rhyssomatus
- Species: R. lineaticollis

Binomial name
- Rhyssomatus lineaticollis (Say, 1824)

= Rhyssomatus lineaticollis =

Species of beetle

Rhyssomatus lineaticollis, also known by its common name milkweed stem weevil is a species of weevil whose adults feed on the stems of the common milkweed, Asclepias syriaca. It is also destructive to the rare and threatened milkweed species Asclepias meadii.

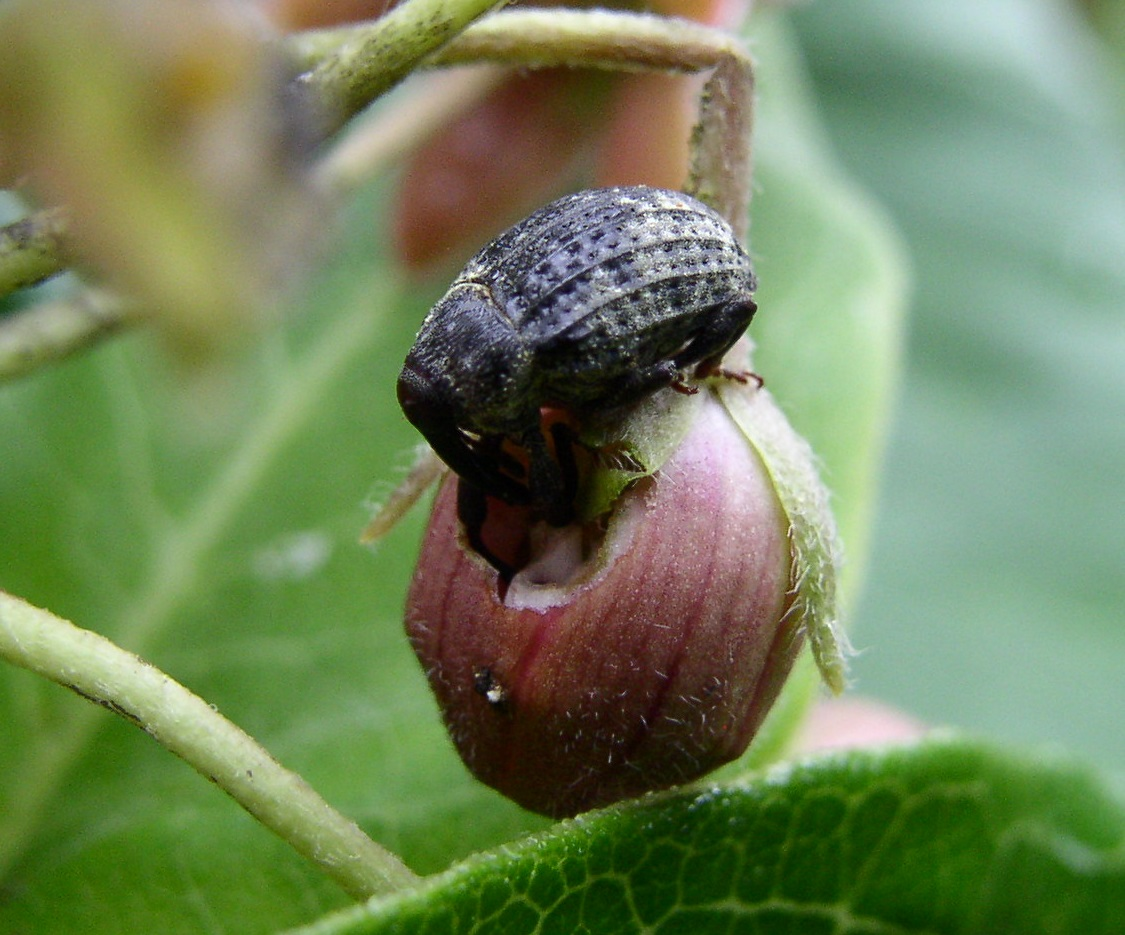
R. lineaticollis on milkweed bud
