= Phaea canescens =

Scientific classification
- Kingdom: Animalia
- Phylum: Arthropoda
- Class: Insecta
- Order: Coleoptera
- Suborder: Polyphaga
- Infraorder: Cucujiformia
- Family: Cerambycidae
- Genus: Phaea
- Species: P. canescens

Binomial name
- Phaea canescens (LeConte, 1852)

Species of beetle

Phaea canescens is a species of beetle in the family Cerambycidae. It was described by John Lawrence LeConte in 1852. It is known from the United States.
