= Tetraopes elegans =

Scientific classification
- Domain: Eukaryota
- Kingdom: Animalia
- Phylum: Arthropoda
- Class: Insecta
- Order: Coleoptera
- Suborder: Polyphaga
- Infraorder: Cucujiformia
- Family: Cerambycidae
- Genus: Tetraopes
- Species: T. elegans

Binomial name
- Tetraopes elegans Horn, 1894

Species of beetle

Tetraopes elegans is a species of beetle in the family Cerambycidae. It was described by George Henry Horn in 1894. It is known from Baja California.
