= Rhyssomatus fissilis =

Scientific classification
- Domain: Eukaryota
- Kingdom: Animalia
- Phylum: Arthropoda
- Class: Insecta
- Order: Coleoptera
- Suborder: Polyphaga
- Infraorder: Cucujiformia
- Family: Curculionidae
- Genus: Rhyssomatus
- Species: R. fissilis

Binomial name
- Rhyssomatus fissilis Burke, 1961

Species of beetle

Rhyssomatus fissilis is a species of true weevil in the beetle family Curculionidae. It is found in North America.
