= Phaea signaticornis =

Scientific classification
- Kingdom: Animalia
- Phylum: Arthropoda
- Class: Insecta
- Order: Coleoptera
- Suborder: Polyphaga
- Infraorder: Cucujiformia
- Family: Cerambycidae
- Genus: Phaea
- Species: P. signaticornis

Binomial name
- Phaea signaticornis Melzer, 1932

Species of beetle

Phaea signaticornis is a species of beetle in the family Cerambycidae. It was described by Melzer in 1932. It is known from Costa Rica.
