= Phaea saperda =

Scientific classification
- Kingdom: Animalia
- Phylum: Arthropoda
- Class: Insecta
- Order: Coleoptera
- Suborder: Polyphaga
- Infraorder: Cucujiformia
- Family: Cerambycidae
- Genus: Phaea
- Species: P. saperda

Binomial name
- Phaea saperda Newman, 1840

Species of beetle

Phaea saperda is a species of beetle in the family Cerambycidae. It was described by Newman in 1840. It is known from Belize, Guatemala, Honduras and Mexico.
