= Tetraopes termophilus =

Scientific classification
- Domain: Eukaryota
- Kingdom: Animalia
- Phylum: Arthropoda
- Class: Insecta
- Order: Coleoptera
- Suborder: Polyphaga
- Infraorder: Cucujiformia
- Family: Cerambycidae
- Genus: Tetraopes
- Species: T. termophilus

Binomial name
- Tetraopes termophilus Chevrolat, 1861

Synonyms
- Tetraopes thermophilus Chevrolat, 1861

Species of beetle

Tetraopes termophilus is a species of beetle in the family Cerambycidae. It was described by Chevrolat in 1861. It is known from Nicaragua and the United States.
