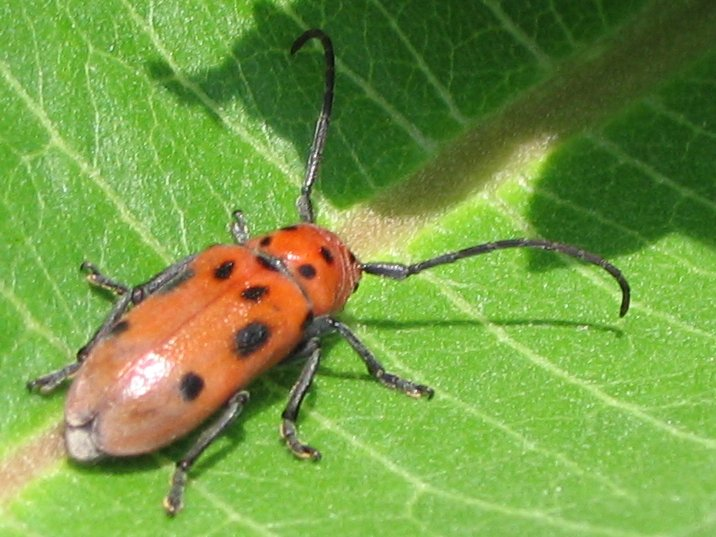
- Tetraopes tetrophthalmus

Scientific classification
- Domain: Eukaryota
- Kingdom: Animalia
- Phylum: Arthropoda
- Class: Insecta
- Order: Coleoptera
- Suborder: Polyphaga
- Infraorder: Cucujiformia
- Family: Cerambycidae
- Subfamily: Lamiinae
- Tribe: Tetraopini
- Genus: Tetraopes; Dalman in Schönherr, 1817

= Tetraopes =

Genus of beetles

Tetraopes is a genus of longhorn beetles of the subfamily Lamiinae, tribe Tetraopini, containing the following species:

- Tetraopes annulatus LeConte, 1847
- Tetraopes basalis LeConte, 1852
- Tetraopes batesi Chemsak, 1963
- Tetraopes cleroides Thomson, 1860
- Tetraopes comes Bates, 1881
- Tetraopes crassus Chemsak & Noguera, 2004
- Tetraopes crinitus Chemsak & Noguera, 2004
- Tetraopes discoideus LeConte, 1858
- Tetraopes elegans Horn, 1894
- Tetraopes femoratus LeConte, 1847
- Tetraopes huetheri Skillman, 2007
- Tetraopes ineditus Chemsak & Giesbert, 1986
- Tetraopes linsleyi Chemsak, 1963
- Tetraopes mandibularis Chemsak, 1963
- Tetraopes melanurus Schoenherr, 1817
- Tetraopes paracomes Chemsak, 1963
- Tetraopes pilosus Chemsak, 1963
- Tetraopes quinquemaculatus Haldeman, 1847
- Tetraopes skillmani Chemsak & Noguera, 2004
- Tetraopes subfasciatus Bates, 1881
- Tetraopes sublaevis Casey, 1913
- Tetraopes termophilus Chevrolat, 1861
- Tetraopes tetrophthalmus (Forster, 1771) - red milkweed beetle
- Tetraopes texanus Horn, 1878
- Tetraopes thermophilus Chevrolat, 1861
- Tetraopes thoreyi Bates, 1881
- Tetraopes umbonatus LeConte, 1852
- Tetraopes varicornis Laporte, 1840

== Extinct species ==
- †Tetraopes submersus (Cockerell, 1908)

== Some species and their host plants ==
- T. annulatus: …........A. sullivantii, A. subverticillata, A. speciosa, A. tuberosa, A. verticillata, A. viridiflorus.
- T. basalis: …...........A. eriocarpa, A. fascicularis, A. speciosa
- T. discoideus: …........A. auriculata, A. curassavica, A. glaucescens, A. linaria, A. subverticillata, A. verticillata
- T. femoratus: …........A. fascicularis, A. hallii, A. hirtella, A. lemmonii, A. meadii, A. speciosa, A. syriaca, A. viridis
- T. huetheri: …..........A. verticillata
- T. linsleyi: …..........A. linaria
- T. mandibularis: …......A. latifolia
- T. melanurus: …........A. capricornis asperula, A. linaris, A. subverticillata, A. tuberosa
- T. paracomes: ........Matelea quirosii
- T. pilosus: …...........A. arenaria, A. tuberosa
- T. quadrimaculatus: …......A. syriaca
- T. quinquemaculatus: ......A. amplexicaulis, A. hirtella
- T. sublaevis: …..........A. erosa
- T. tetrophthalmus: …......A. syriaca
- T. texanus: …............A. hirtella, A. viridiflora, A. viridis
