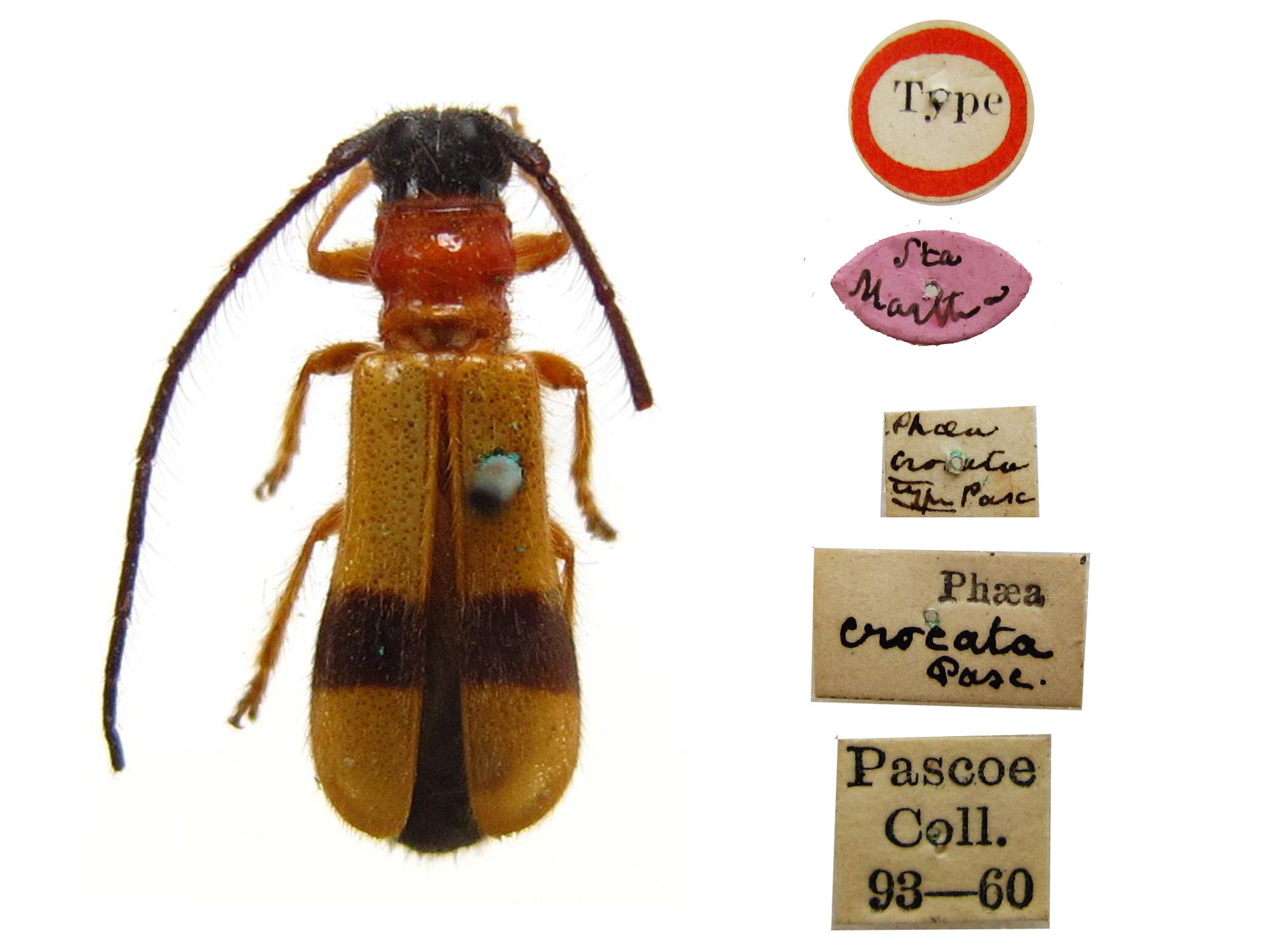
- Phaea crocata

Scientific classification
- Kingdom: Animalia
- Phylum: Arthropoda
- Class: Insecta
- Order: Coleoptera
- Suborder: Polyphaga
- Infraorder: Cucujiformia
- Family: Cerambycidae
- Genus: Phaea
- Species: P. crocata

Binomial name
- Phaea crocata Pascoe, 1866

= Phaea crocata =

Species of beetle

Phaea crocata is a species of beetle in the family Cerambycidae. It was described by Francis Polkinghorne Pascoe in 1866. It is known from Panama and Colombia.
