= Rhyssomatus aequalis =

Scientific classification
- Domain: Eukaryota
- Kingdom: Animalia
- Phylum: Arthropoda
- Class: Insecta
- Order: Coleoptera
- Suborder: Polyphaga
- Infraorder: Cucujiformia
- Family: Curculionidae
- Genus: Rhyssomatus
- Species: R. aequalis

Binomial name
- Rhyssomatus aequalis Horn, 1873

Species of beetle

Rhyssomatus aequalis is a species of true weevil in the beetle family Curculionidae. It is found in North America.
