= Phaea copei =

Scientific classification
- Kingdom: Animalia
- Phylum: Arthropoda
- Clade: Pancrustacea
- Class: Insecta
- Order: Coleoptera
- Suborder: Polyphaga
- Infraorder: Cucujiformia
- Family: Cerambycidae
- Genus: Phaea
- Species: P. copei

Binomial name
- Phaea copei Chemsak, 2000/1999

Species of beetle

Phaea copei is a species of beetle in the family Cerambycidae. It was described by John Andrew Chemsak in 1999. It is endemic to Costa Rica. It is named after James S. Cope.

Phaea copei measure 6–11 mm (0.24–0.43 in) in length.
