= Phaea rubella =

Scientific classification
- Kingdom: Animalia
- Phylum: Arthropoda
- Class: Insecta
- Order: Coleoptera
- Suborder: Polyphaga
- Infraorder: Cucujiformia
- Family: Cerambycidae
- Genus: Phaea
- Species: P. rubella

Binomial name
- Phaea rubella Bates, 1881

Species of beetle

Phaea rubella is a species of beetle in the family Cerambycidae. It was described by Henry Walter Bates in 1881. It is known from Costa Rica and Mexico.
