= Mecasoma =

Scientific classification
- Kingdom: Animalia
- Phylum: Arthropoda
- Class: Insecta
- Order: Coleoptera
- Suborder: Polyphaga
- Infraorder: Cucujiformia
- Family: Cerambycidae
- Subfamily: Lamiinae
- Tribe: Tetraopini
- Genus: Mecasoma; Chemsak & Linsley, 1974
- Species: M. validicornis

Binomial name
- Mecasoma validicornis (Bates, 1885)

Synonyms
- Tetrops validicornis Bates, 1885

Species of beetle

Mecasoma validicornis is a species of beetle in the family Cerambycidae, and the only species in the genus Mecasoma. It was described by Henry Walter Bates in 1885.
