= Tetraopes batesi =

Scientific classification
- Domain: Eukaryota
- Kingdom: Animalia
- Phylum: Arthropoda
- Class: Insecta
- Order: Coleoptera
- Suborder: Polyphaga
- Infraorder: Cucujiformia
- Family: Cerambycidae
- Genus: Tetraopes
- Species: T. batesi

Binomial name
- Tetraopes batesi Chemsak, 1963

Species of beetle

Tetraopes batesi is a species of beetle in the family Cerambycidae. It was described by Chemsak in 1963. It is known from Mexico.
