= Phaea (beetle) =

Scientific classification
- Kingdom: Animalia
- Phylum: Arthropoda
- Class: Insecta
- Order: Coleoptera
- Suborder: Polyphaga
- Infraorder: Cucujiformia
- Family: Cerambycidae
- Tribe: Tetraopini
- Genus: Phaea; Newman, 1840

Species
- See text

Genus of beetles

Phaea is a genus of longhorn beetles of the subfamily Lamiinae, containing the following species:

- Phaea acromela Pascoe, 1858
- Phaea andrewsi Chemsak, 1999
- Phaea astatheoides Pascoe, 1866
- Phaea beierli Chemsak, 1999
- Phaea biplagiata Chemsak, 1977
- Phaea brevicornis Chemsak, 1999
- Phaea bryani Chemsak, 1999
- Phaea canescens (LeConte, 1852)
- Phaea carnelia Chemsak & Linsley, 1988
- Phaea coccinea Bates, 1866
- Phaea copei Chemsak, 1999
- Phaea crocata Pascoe, 1866
- Phaea elegantula Melzer, 1933
- Phaea erinae Chemsak, 1999
- Phaea eyai Chemsak, 1999
- Phaea flavovittata Bates, 1881
- Phaea giesberti Chemsak, 1999
- Phaea haleyae Chemsak, 1999
- Phaea hatsueae Chemsak, 1999
- Phaea hoegei Bates, 1881
- Phaea hovorei Chemsak, 1999
- Phaea howdenorum Chemsak, 1999
- Phaea janzeni Chemsak, 1999
- Phaea johni Chemsak, 1999
- Phaea juanitae Chemsak & Linsley, 1988
- Phaea kaitlinae Chemsak, 1999
- Phaea kellyae Chemsak, 1999
- Phaea lateralis Bates, 1881
- Phaea laurieae Chemsak, 1999
- Phaea lawi Chemsak, 1999
- Phaea linsleyi Chemsak, 1999
- Phaea maccartyi Chemsak, 1999
- Phaea mankinsi Chemsak & Linsley, 1979
- Phaea mariae Chemsak, 1999
- Phaea marthae Chemsak, 1977
- Phaea maryannae Chemsak, 1977
- Phaea maxima Bates, 1881
- Phaea miniata Pascoe, 1858
- Phaea mirabilis Bates, 1874
- Phaea monostigma (Haldeman, 1847)
- Phaea nigripennis Bates, 1881
- Phaea nigromaculata Bates, 1881
- Phaea noguerai Chemsak, 1999
- Phaea phthisica Bates, 1881
- Phaea rosea Bates, 1885
- Phaea rubella Bates, 1881
- Phaea rufiventris Bates, 1872
- Phaea saperda Newman, 1840
- Phaea scuticollis Bates, 1872
- Phaea semirufa Bates, 1872
- Phaea sharonae Chemsak, 1999
- Phaea sherylae Chemsak, 1999
- Phaea signaticornis Melzer, 1932
- Phaea tenuata Bates, 1872
- Phaea tricolor Bates, 1881
- Phaea turnbowi Chemsak, 1999
- Phaea vitticollis Bates, 1872
- Phaea wappesi Chemsak, 1999
