= Phaea coccinea =

Scientific classification
- Kingdom: Animalia
- Phylum: Arthropoda
- Class: Insecta
- Order: Coleoptera
- Suborder: Polyphaga
- Infraorder: Cucujiformia
- Family: Cerambycidae
- Genus: Phaea
- Species: P. coccinea

Binomial name
- Phaea coccinea Bates, 1866

Species of beetle

Phaea coccinea is a species of beetle in the family Cerambycidae. It was described by Henry Walter Bates in 1866. It is known from Brazil.
