= Tetraopes ineditus =

Scientific classification
- Domain: Eukaryota
- Kingdom: Animalia
- Phylum: Arthropoda
- Class: Insecta
- Order: Coleoptera
- Suborder: Polyphaga
- Infraorder: Cucujiformia
- Family: Cerambycidae
- Genus: Tetraopes
- Species: T. ineditus

Binomial name
- Tetraopes ineditus Chemsak & Giesbert, 1986

Species of beetle

Tetraopes ineditus is a species of beetle in the family Cerambycidae. It was described by Chemsak and Giesbert in 1986. It is known from Mexico.
