= Phaea elegantula =

Scientific classification
- Kingdom: Animalia
- Phylum: Arthropoda
- Class: Insecta
- Order: Coleoptera
- Suborder: Polyphaga
- Infraorder: Cucujiformia
- Family: Cerambycidae
- Genus: Phaea
- Species: P. elegantula

Binomial name
- Phaea elegantula Melzer, 1933

Species of beetle

Phaea elegantula is a species of beetle in the family Cerambycidae. It was described by Melzer in 1933. It is known from Costa Rica.
