= Rhyssomatus parvulus =

Scientific classification
- Kingdom: Animalia
- Phylum: Arthropoda
- Class: Insecta
- Order: Coleoptera
- Suborder: Polyphaga
- Infraorder: Cucujiformia
- Family: Curculionidae
- Genus: Rhyssomatus
- Species: R. parvulus

Binomial name
- Rhyssomatus parvulus (Casey, 1895)

Species of beetle

Rhyssomatus parvulus is a species of true weevil in the beetle family Curculionidae.
