= Phaea maryannae =

Scientific classification
- Kingdom: Animalia
- Phylum: Arthropoda
- Class: Insecta
- Order: Coleoptera
- Suborder: Polyphaga
- Infraorder: Cucujiformia
- Family: Cerambycidae
- Genus: Phaea
- Species: P. maryannae

Binomial name
- Phaea maryannae Chemsak, 1977

Species of beetle

Phaea maryannae is a species of beetle in the family Cerambycidae. It was described by Chemsak in 1977. It is known from Mexico.
