= Phaea juanitae =

Scientific classification
- Kingdom: Animalia
- Phylum: Arthropoda
- Class: Insecta
- Order: Coleoptera
- Suborder: Polyphaga
- Infraorder: Cucujiformia
- Family: Cerambycidae
- Genus: Phaea
- Species: P. juanitae

Binomial name
- Phaea juanitae Chemsak & Linsley, 1988

Species of beetle

Phaea juanitae is a species of beetle in the family Cerambycidae. It was described by Chemsak and Linsley in 1988. It is known from Mexico.
