= Tetraopes annulatus =

Scientific classification
- Domain: Eukaryota
- Kingdom: Animalia
- Phylum: Arthropoda
- Class: Insecta
- Order: Coleoptera
- Suborder: Polyphaga
- Infraorder: Cucujiformia
- Family: Cerambycidae
- Genus: Tetraopes
- Species: T. annulatus

Binomial name
- Tetraopes annulatus LeConte, 1847

Synonyms
- Tetraopes uteanus Casey, 1913; Tetraopes vestitus Casey, 1913; Tetraopes canescens fontinalis Casey, 1913; Tetraopes canescens LeConte, 1852; Tetraopes huetheri Skillman, 2007

Species of beetle

Tetraopes annulatus is a species of beetle in the family Cerambycidae. It was described by John Lawrence LeConte in 1847. It is known from the United States and Canada. Reported feeding on Asclepias sullivantii, A. subverticillata, A. speciosa, A. tuberosa, A. verticillata, A. viridiflorus.

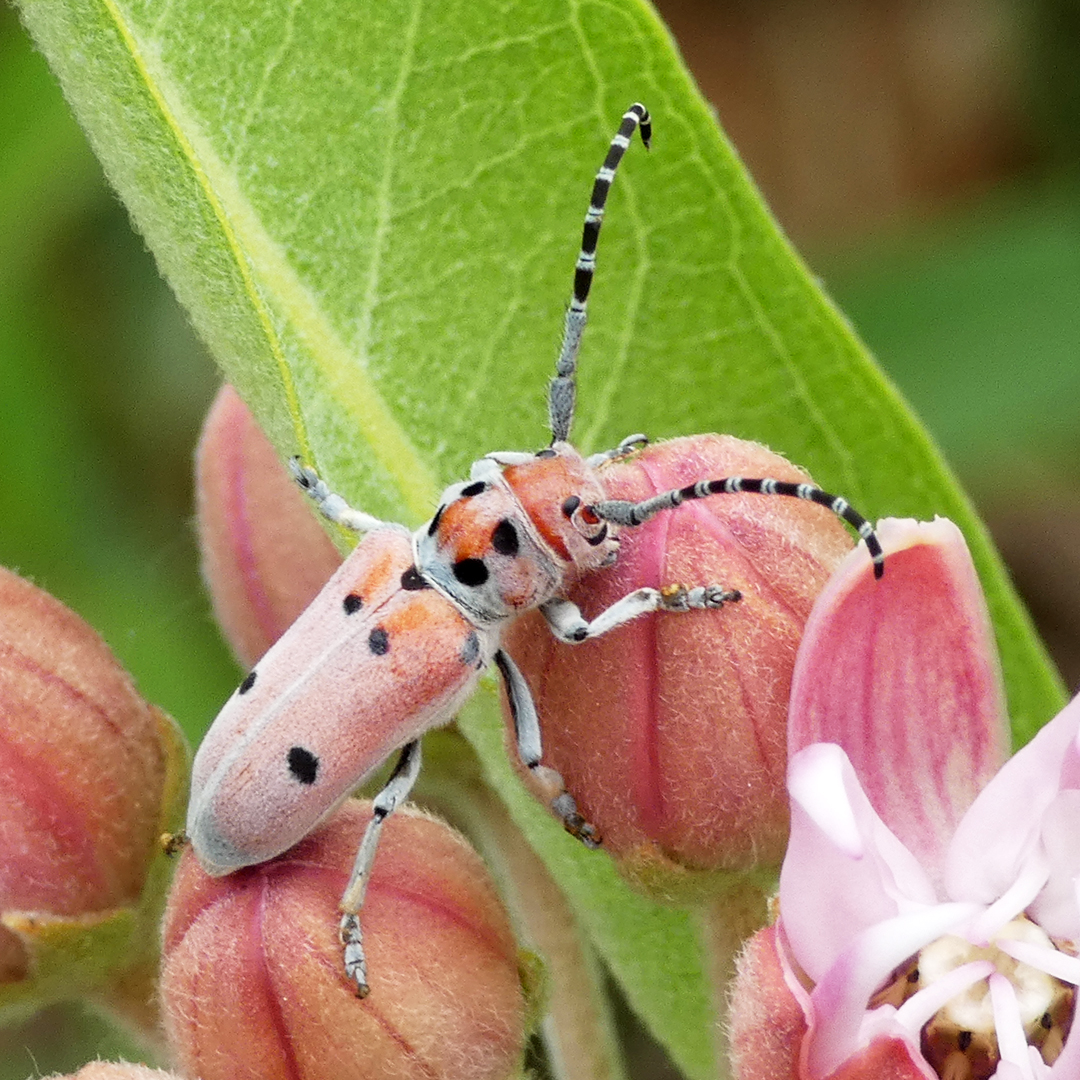
Tetraopes annulatus on showy milkweed
