= Phaea hatsueae =

Scientific classification
- Kingdom: Animalia
- Phylum: Arthropoda
- Class: Insecta
- Order: Coleoptera
- Suborder: Polyphaga
- Infraorder: Cucujiformia
- Family: Cerambycidae
- Genus: Phaea
- Species: P. hatsueae

Binomial name
- Phaea hatsueae Chemsak, 1999

Species of beetle

Phaea hatsueae is a species of beetle in the family Cerambycidae. It was described by Chemsak in 1999. It is known from Costa Rica.
