= Phaea tenuata =

Scientific classification
- Kingdom: Animalia
- Phylum: Arthropoda
- Class: Insecta
- Order: Coleoptera
- Suborder: Polyphaga
- Infraorder: Cucujiformia
- Family: Cerambycidae
- Genus: Phaea
- Species: P. tenuata

Binomial name
- Phaea tenuata Bates, 1872

Species of beetle

Phaea tenuata is a species of beetle in the family Cerambycidae. It was described by Henry Walter Bates in 1872. It is known to be native to Mexico.
