= Phaea vitticollis =

Scientific classification
- Kingdom: Animalia
- Phylum: Arthropoda
- Class: Insecta
- Order: Coleoptera
- Suborder: Polyphaga
- Infraorder: Cucujiformia
- Family: Cerambycidae
- Genus: Phaea
- Species: P. vitticollis

Binomial name
- Phaea vitticollis Bates, 1872

Species of beetle

Phaea vitticollis is a species of beetle in the family Cerambycidae. It was described by Henry Walter Bates in 1872. It is known from Mexico.
