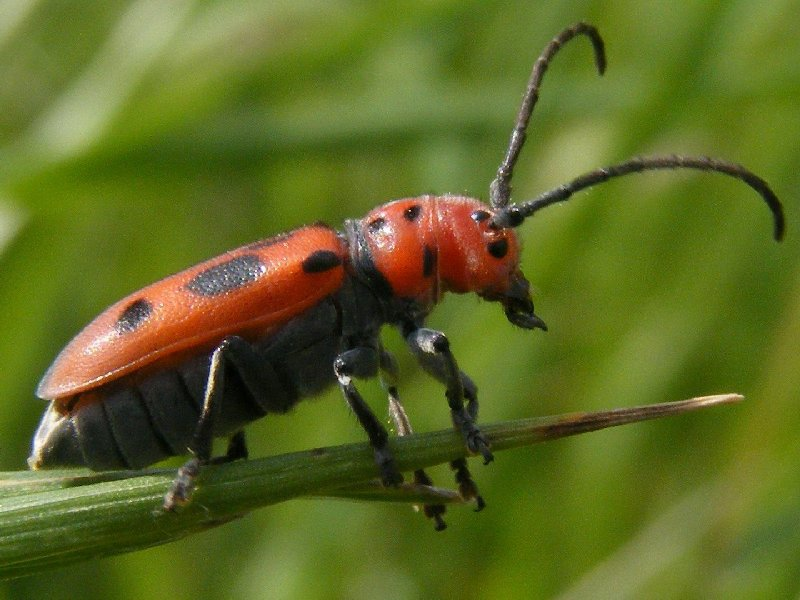
- Tetraopes tetrophthalmus

Scientific classification
- Domain: Eukaryota
- Kingdom: Animalia
- Phylum: Arthropoda
- Class: Insecta
- Order: Coleoptera
- Suborder: Polyphaga
- Infraorder: Cucujiformia
- Family: Cerambycidae
- Subfamily: Lamiinae
- Tribe: Tetraopini; Thomson, 1860

= Tetraopini =

Tribe of beetles

Tetraopini is a tribe of longhorn beetles in the subfamily Lamiinae.

== Taxonomy ==
- Mecasoma Chemsak & Linsley, 1974
- Phaea Newman, 1840
- Tetraopes Dalman in Schönherr, 1817
