= Phaea mirabilis =

Scientific classification
- Kingdom: Animalia
- Phylum: Arthropoda
- Class: Insecta
- Order: Coleoptera
- Suborder: Polyphaga
- Infraorder: Cucujiformia
- Family: Cerambycidae
- Genus: Phaea
- Species: P. mirabilis

Binomial name
- Phaea mirabilis Bates, 1874

Species of beetle

Phaea mirabilis is a species of beetle in the family Cerambycidae. It was described by Henry Walter Bates in 1874. It is known from Costa Rica and Mexico.
