= Phaea scuticollis =

Scientific classification
- Kingdom: Animalia
- Phylum: Arthropoda
- Class: Insecta
- Order: Coleoptera
- Suborder: Polyphaga
- Infraorder: Cucujiformia
- Family: Cerambycidae
- Genus: Phaea
- Species: P. scuticollis

Binomial name
- Phaea scuticollis Bates, 1872

Species of beetle

Phaea scuticollis is a species of beetle in the family Cerambycidae. It was described by Henry Walter Bates in 1872. It is known from Costa Rica, Nicaragua and Panama.
