= Tetraopes cleroides =

Scientific classification
- Domain: Eukaryota
- Kingdom: Animalia
- Phylum: Arthropoda
- Class: Insecta
- Order: Coleoptera
- Suborder: Polyphaga
- Infraorder: Cucujiformia
- Family: Cerambycidae
- Genus: Tetraopes
- Species: T. cleroides

Binomial name
- Tetraopes cleroides Thomson, 1860

Species of beetle

Tetraopes cleroides is a species of beetle in the family Cerambycidae. It was described by James Thomson in 1860. It is known from Mexico.
