= Tetraopes thermophilus =

Scientific classification
- Kingdom: Animalia
- Phylum: Arthropoda
- Class: Insecta
- Order: Coleoptera
- Suborder: Polyphaga
- Infraorder: Cucujiformia
- Family: Cerambycidae
- Genus: Tetraopes
- Species: T. thermophilus

Binomial name
- Tetraopes thermophilus Chevrolat, 1861

Species of beetle

Tetraopes thermophilus is a species of flat-faced longhorn in the beetle family Cerambycidae. It is found in Central America and North America.
