= Tetraopes quinquemaculatus =

Scientific classification
- Domain: Eukaryota
- Kingdom: Animalia
- Phylum: Arthropoda
- Class: Insecta
- Order: Coleoptera
- Suborder: Polyphaga
- Infraorder: Cucujiformia
- Family: Cerambycidae
- Genus: Tetraopes
- Species: T. quinquemaculatus

Binomial name
- Tetraopes quinquemaculatus Haldeman, 1847

Species of beetle

Tetraopes quinquemaculatus is a species of beetle in the family Cerambycidae. It was described by Haldeman in 1847. It is known from North America.
