= Tetraopes thoreyi =

Scientific classification
- Domain: Eukaryota
- Kingdom: Animalia
- Phylum: Arthropoda
- Class: Insecta
- Order: Coleoptera
- Suborder: Polyphaga
- Infraorder: Cucujiformia
- Family: Cerambycidae
- Genus: Tetraopes
- Species: T. thoreyi

Binomial name
- Tetraopes thoreyi Bates, 1881

Species of beetle

Tetraopes thoreyi is a species of beetle in the family Cerambycidae. It was described by Henry Walter Bates in 1881. It is known from Mexico.
