= Phaea monostigma =

Scientific classification
- Kingdom: Animalia
- Phylum: Arthropoda
- Class: Insecta
- Order: Coleoptera
- Suborder: Polyphaga
- Infraorder: Cucujiformia
- Family: Cerambycidae
- Genus: Phaea
- Species: P. monostigma

Binomial name
- Phaea monostigma (Haldeman, 1847)

Synonyms
- Tetrops expurgata Casey, 1913; Tetrops monostigma (Haldeman) LeConte, 1852; Tetrops jucunda LeConte, 1862; Oberopa monostigma (Haldeman) Haldeman, 1847; Oberea monostigma Haldeman, 1847

Species of beetle

Phaea monostigma is a species of beetle in the family Cerambycidae. It was described by Haldeman in 1847, originally under the genus Oberea. It is known from the United States.
