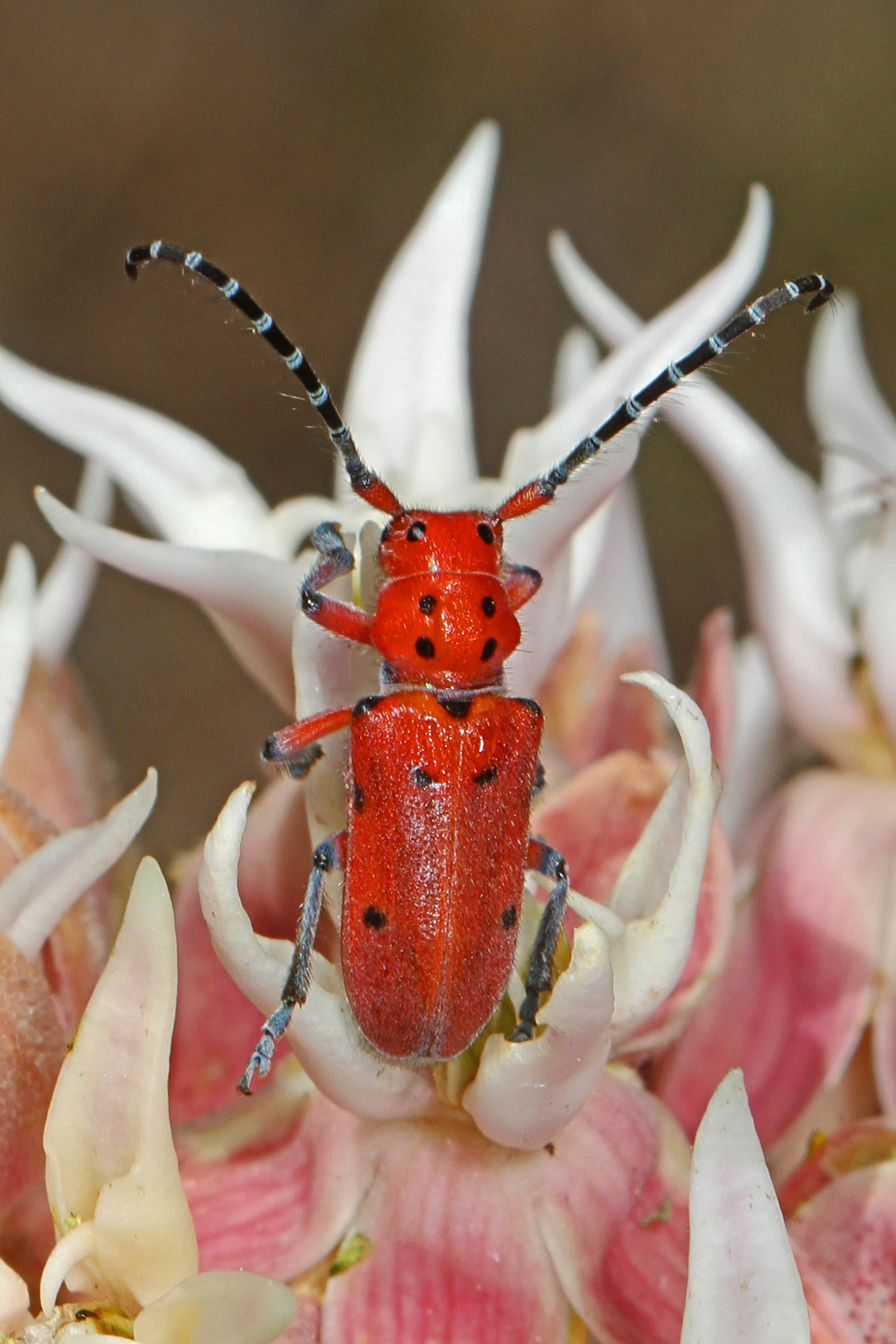

Scientific classification
- Kingdom: Animalia
- Phylum: Arthropoda
- Clade: Pancrustacea
- Class: Insecta
- Order: Coleoptera
- Suborder: Polyphaga
- Infraorder: Cucujiformia
- Family: Cerambycidae
- Genus: Tetraopes
- Species: T. femoratus

Binomial name
- Tetraopes femoratus LeConte, 1847

= Tetraopes femoratus =

Species of beetle

Tetraopes femoratus is a species of beetle in the family Cerambycidae. It was described by John Lawrence LeConte in 1847. It is known from Mexico and the United States.

== Diet ==
Like other Tetraopes species, T. femoratus feeds on species of Asclepias (milkweeds). Species that T. femoratus feeds on include A. hirtella, A. syriaca, A. latifolia, A. viridis, A. speciosa, A. hallii, A. fascicularis, and A. lemmonii.
