= Tetraopes crinitus =

Scientific classification
- Domain: Eukaryota
- Kingdom: Animalia
- Phylum: Arthropoda
- Class: Insecta
- Order: Coleoptera
- Suborder: Polyphaga
- Infraorder: Cucujiformia
- Family: Cerambycidae
- Genus: Tetraopes
- Species: T. crinitus

Binomial name
- Tetraopes crinitus Chemsak & Noguera, 2004

Species of beetle

Tetraopes crinitus is a species of beetle in the family Cerambycidae. It was described by Chemsak and Noguera in 2004. It is known from Mexico.
