= Phaea hoegei =

Scientific classification
- Kingdom: Animalia
- Phylum: Arthropoda
- Class: Insecta
- Order: Coleoptera
- Suborder: Polyphaga
- Infraorder: Cucujiformia
- Family: Cerambycidae
- Genus: Phaea
- Species: P. hoegei

Binomial name
- Phaea hoegei Bates, 1881

Synonyms
- Phaea högei Bates, 1881

Species of beetle

Phaea hoegei is a species of beetle in the family Cerambycidae. It was described by Henry Walter Bates in 1881. It is known from Mexico.
