= Tetraopes umbonatus =

Scientific classification
- Domain: Eukaryota
- Kingdom: Animalia
- Phylum: Arthropoda
- Class: Insecta
- Order: Coleoptera
- Suborder: Polyphaga
- Infraorder: Cucujiformia
- Family: Cerambycidae
- Genus: Tetraopes
- Species: T. umbonatus

Binomial name
- Tetraopes umbonatus LeConte, 1852

Species of beetle

Tetraopes umbonatus is a species of beetle in the family Cerambycidae. It was described by John Lawrence LeConte in 1852. It is known from Nicaragua and Mexico.
