= Tetraopes sublaevis =

Scientific classification
- Kingdom: Animalia
- Phylum: Arthropoda
- Class: Insecta
- Order: Coleoptera
- Suborder: Polyphaga
- Infraorder: Cucujiformia
- Family: Cerambycidae
- Genus: Tetraopes
- Species: T. sublaevis

Binomial name
- Tetraopes sublaevis Casey, 1913

Species of beetle

Tetraopes sublaevis is a species of beetle in the family Cerambycidae. It was described by Thomas Lincoln Casey Jr. in 1913. It is known from the United States.
