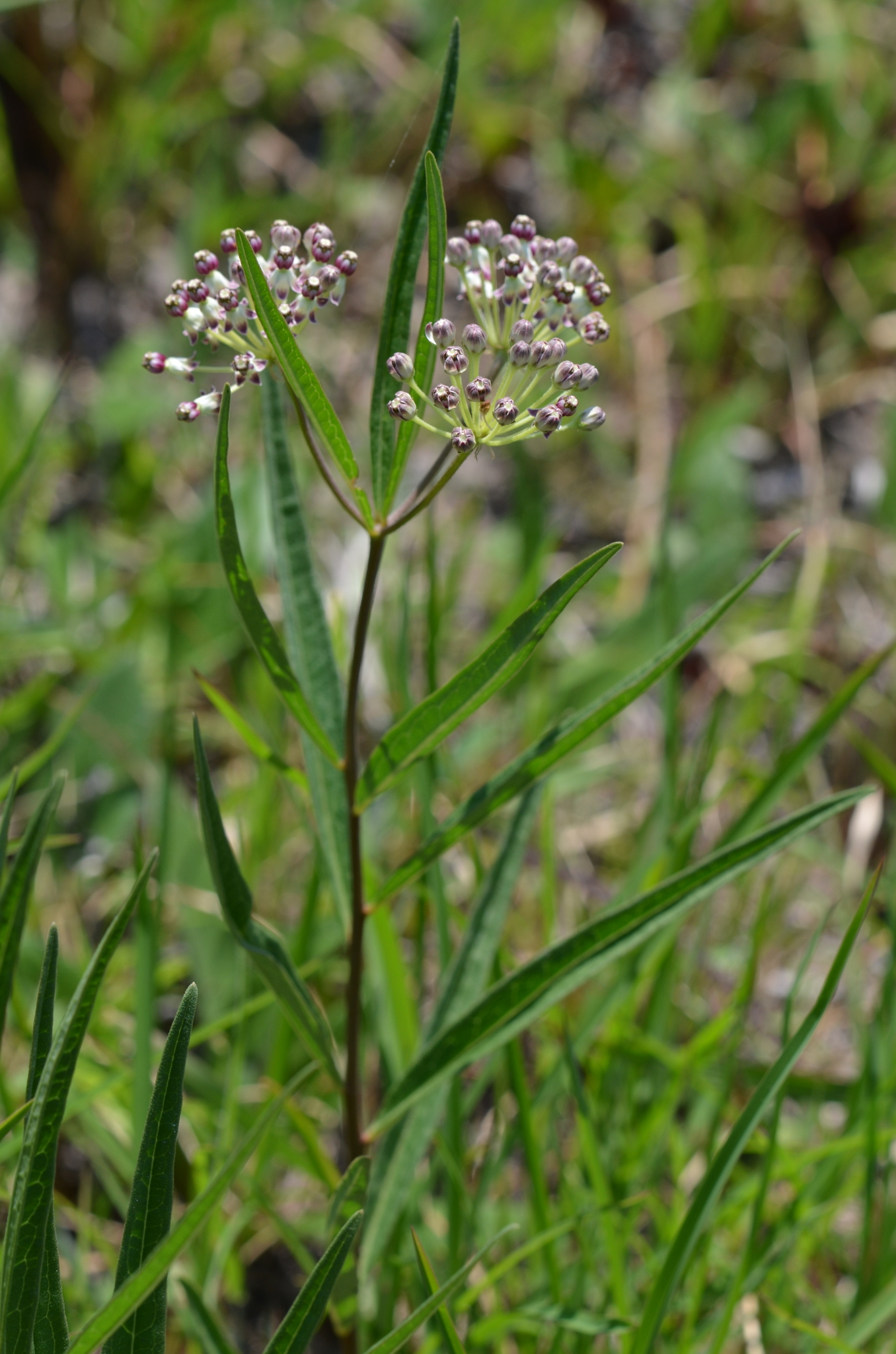
- In St. Tammany Parish, Louisiana

Conservation status
- Apparently Secure (NatureServe)

Scientific classification
- Kingdom: Plantae
- Clade: Tracheophytes
- Clade: Angiosperms
- Clade: Eudicots
- Clade: Asterids
- Order: Gentianales
- Family: Apocynaceae
- Genus: Asclepias
- Species: A. longifolia

Binomial name
- Asclepias longifolia Michx.

= Asclepias longifolia =

Species of plant

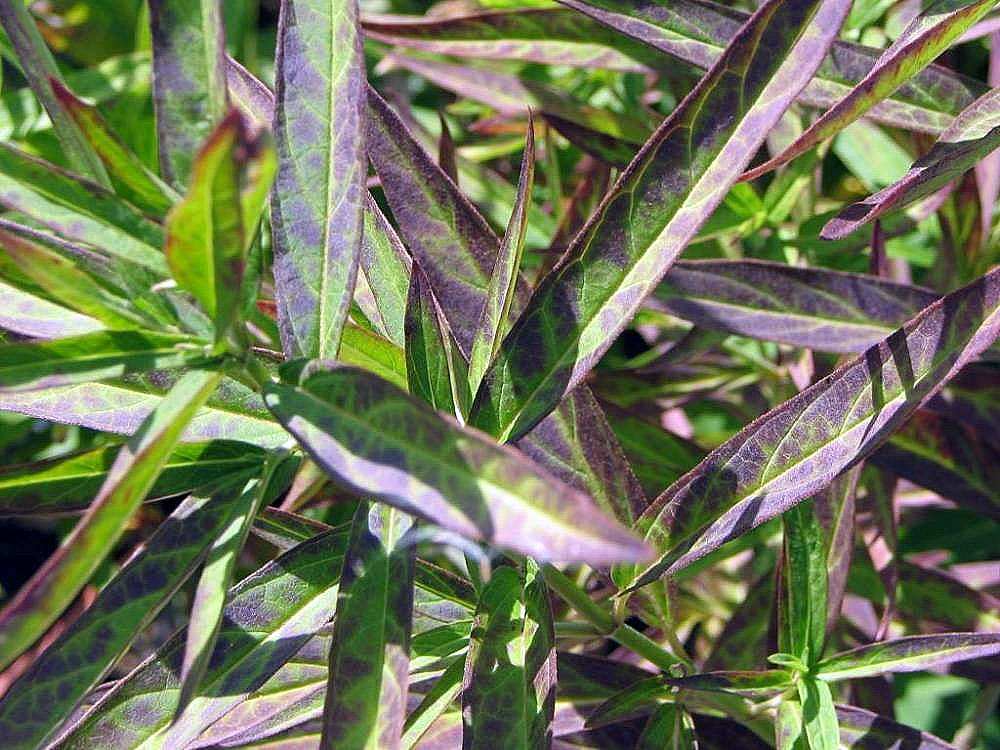
Foliage of Asclepias longifolia (Potomac, Maryland. September 2005)

Asclepias longifolia, or the longleaf milkweed, is a flowering plant native to the southern United States from Texas to Delaware. It is rare in the north end of its range and is presumed to be extinct in Delaware.
