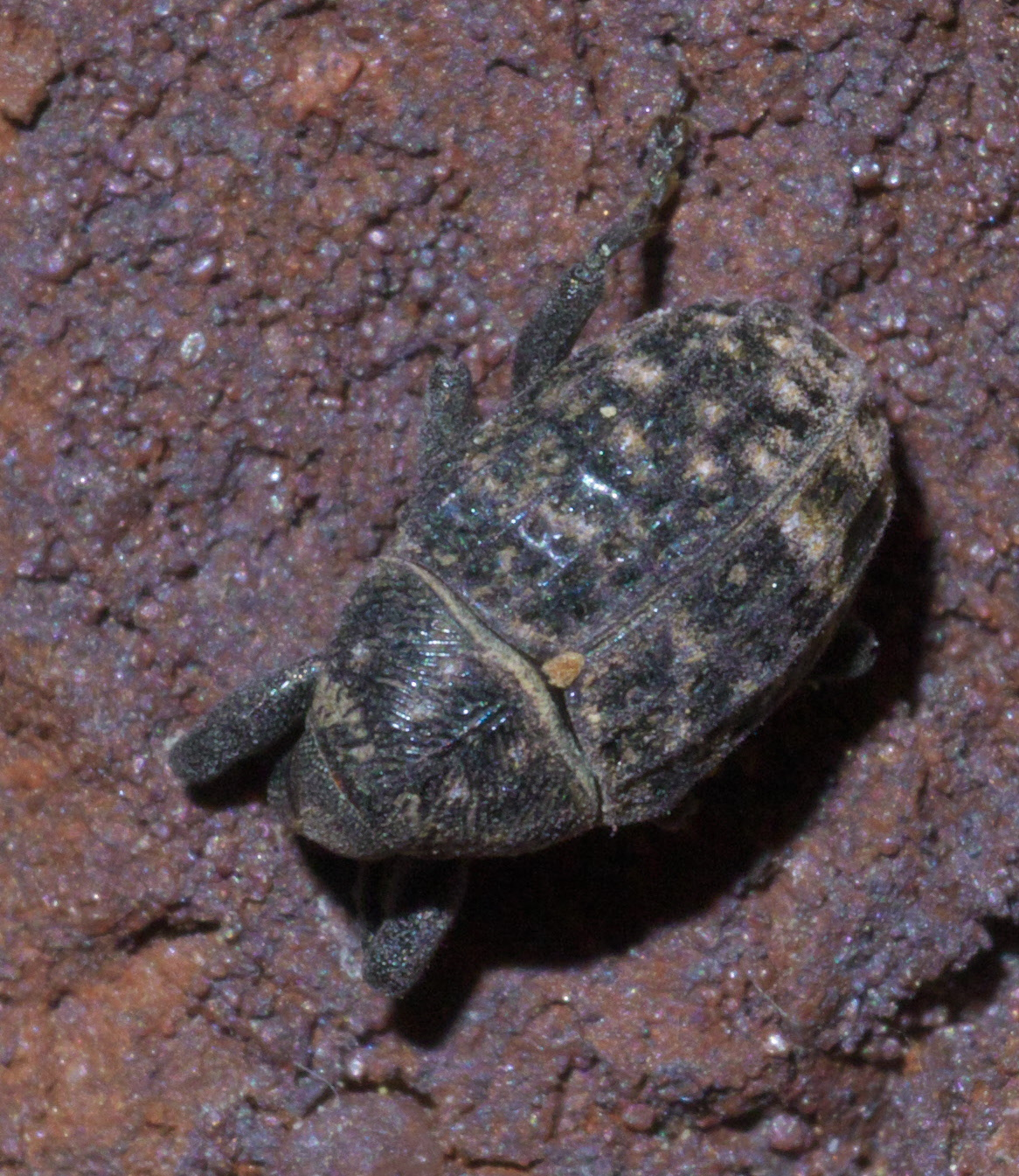
- Rhyssomatus palmacollis

Scientific classification
- Kingdom: Animalia
- Phylum: Arthropoda
- Clade: Pancrustacea
- Class: Insecta
- Order: Coleoptera
- Suborder: Polyphaga
- Infraorder: Cucujiformia
- Superfamily: Curculionoidea
- Family: Curculionidae
- Subfamily: Molytinae
- Genus: Rhyssomatus; Schönherr, 1837

Diversity
- About 190 species

= Rhyssomatus =

Genus of beetles

Rhyssomatus is a genus of true weevils in the beetle family Curculionidae, from the Americas. There are about 190 recognized Rhyssomatus species.

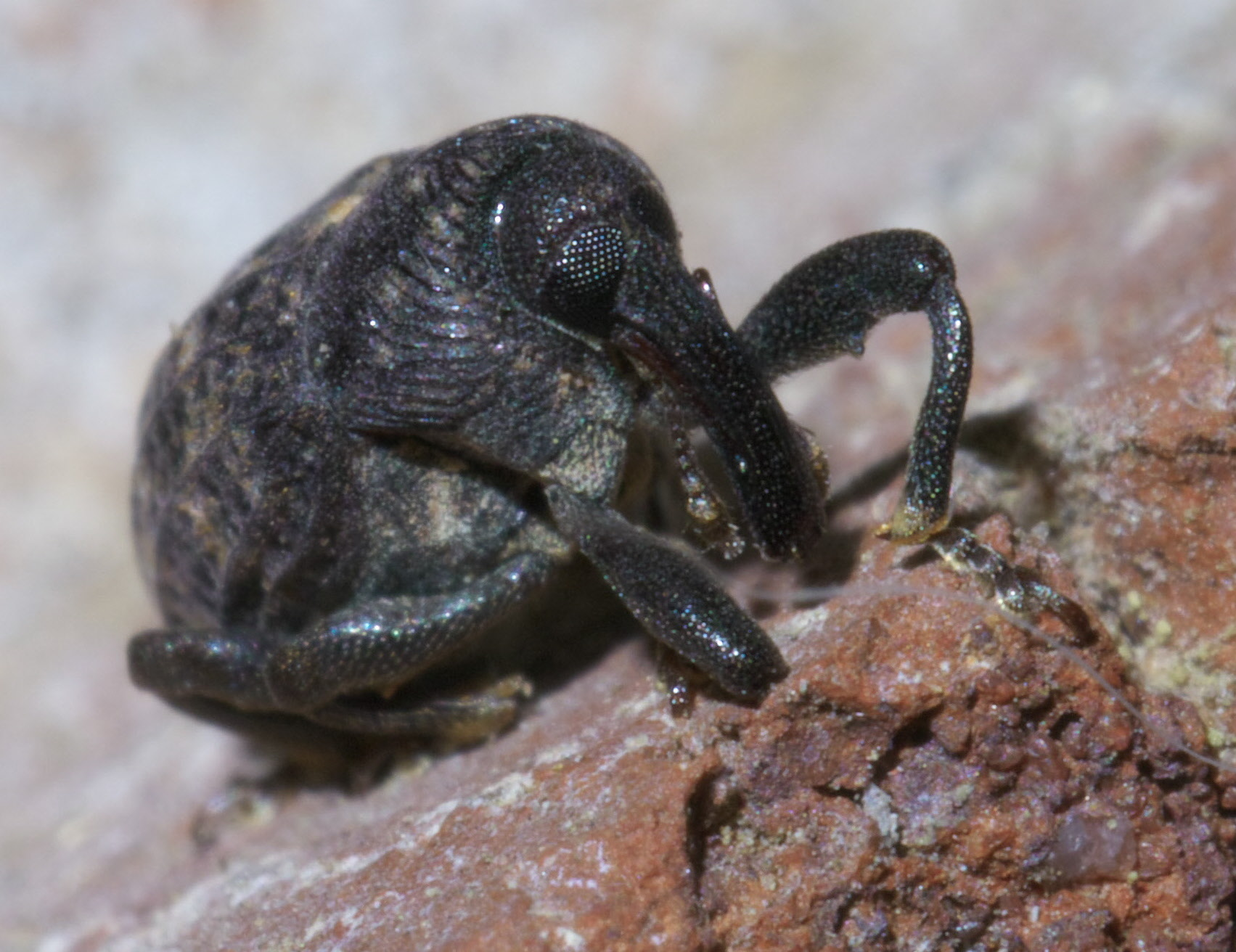
Rhyssomatus palmacollis

== See also ==
- List of Rhyssomatus species
