= Green milkweed =

List of plants with the same or similar names

Green milkweed is a common name of three species of plant:

- Asclepias oenotheroides
- Asclepias viridis
- Asclepias viridiflora
