= Sidecluster milkweed =

Sidecluster milkweed may refer to two different species of plants:

- Asclepias lanuginosa
- Asclepias oenotheroides
