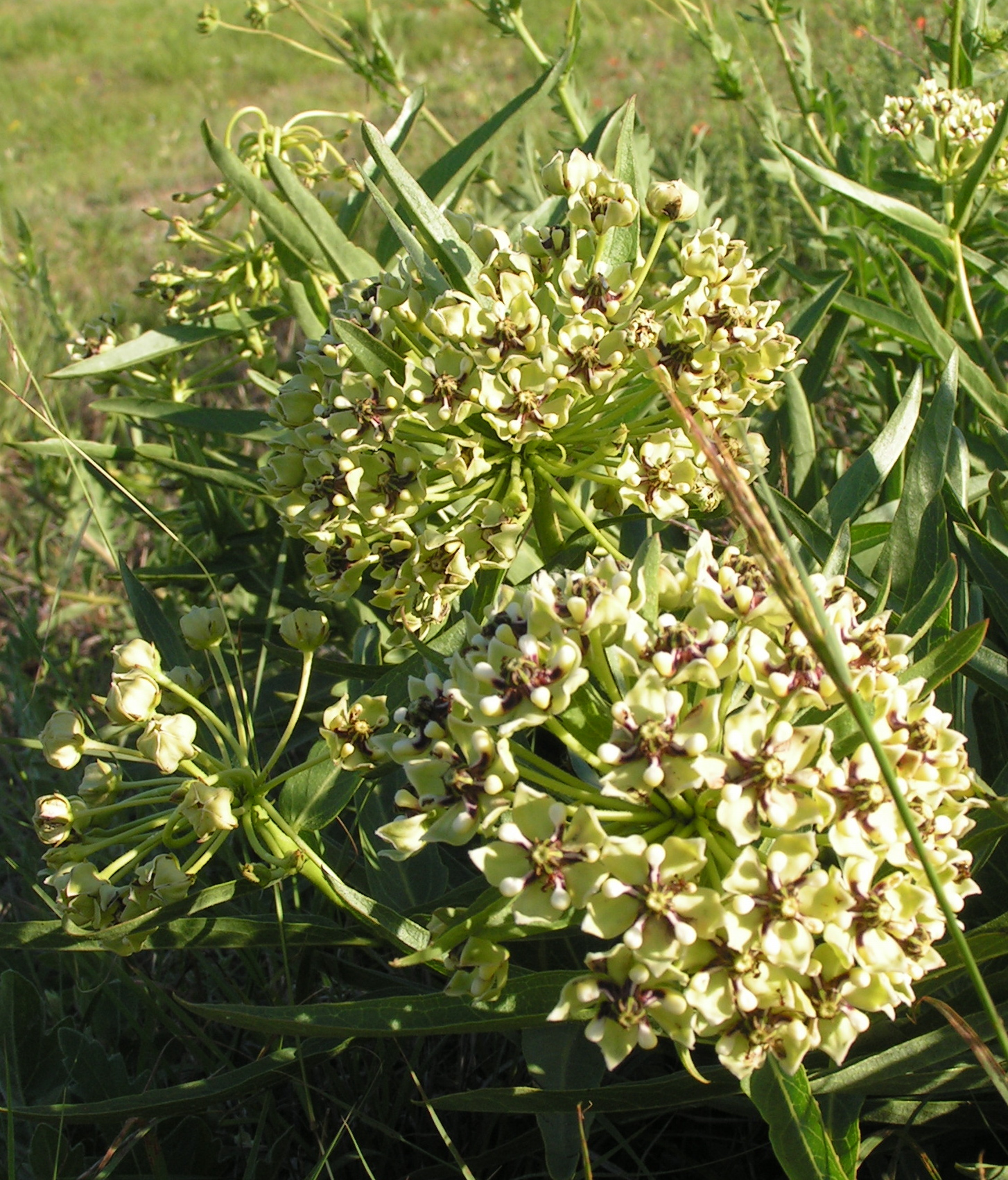

Conservation status
- Secure (NatureServe)

Scientific classification
- Kingdom: Plantae
- Clade: Embryophytes
- Clade: Tracheophytes
- Clade: Spermatophytes
- Clade: Angiosperms
- Clade: Eudicots
- Clade: Asterids
- Order: Gentianales
- Family: Apocynaceae
- Genus: Asclepias
- Species: A. asperula

Binomial name
- Asclepias asperula (Decne.) Woodson

Synonyms
- Acerates asperula Decne.; Asclepias capricornu Woodson; Asclepias decumbens (Nutt.) K.Schum. nom. illeg.; Asclepiodora asperula (Decne.) E.Fourn.; Asclepiodora decumbens (Nutt.) A.Gray

= Asclepias asperula =

Antelope horns

Species of flowering plant

Asclepias asperula, commonly called antelope horns milkweed or spider milkweed, is a species of milkweed native to the Southwestern United States and northern Mexico.

== Description ==
It is a perennial plant growing to 0.3–0.9 m (1–3 ft) tall, with clustered greenish-yellow flowers with maroon highlights. It blooms from April through June.

Antelope horns is a common milkweed in Central Texas. It gets its name from the follicles (seed pods) that resemble the horns of antelope. You can easily spot the flower clusters (technically, umbellate cymes) in open meadows. Milkweed plants are a major food source for Monarch and Queen butterfly caterpillars and as with other milkweed plants, it bleeds white latex if a stem is cut and this sap is toxic to some animals and to humans. It also makes Monarch and Queen butterflies taste bad to potential predators, an effective defense mechanism. From a distance the flowers appear as tennis-sized spheres, but they are clusters of small green, purple, and white flowers. Each flower has 5 pale green petals that cup upward around 5 prominent white hoods (which store nectar).

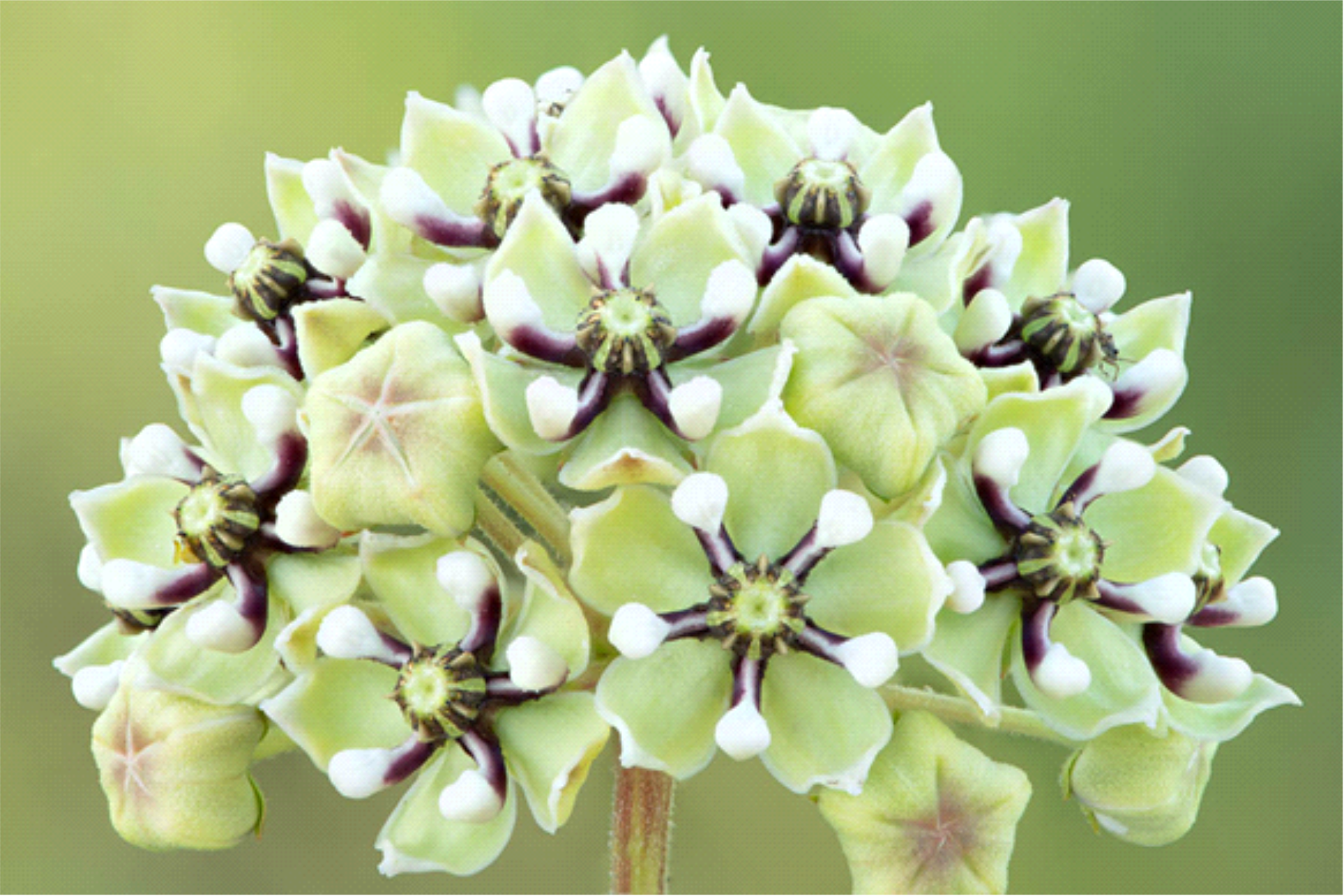

== Flower structure and pollination ==
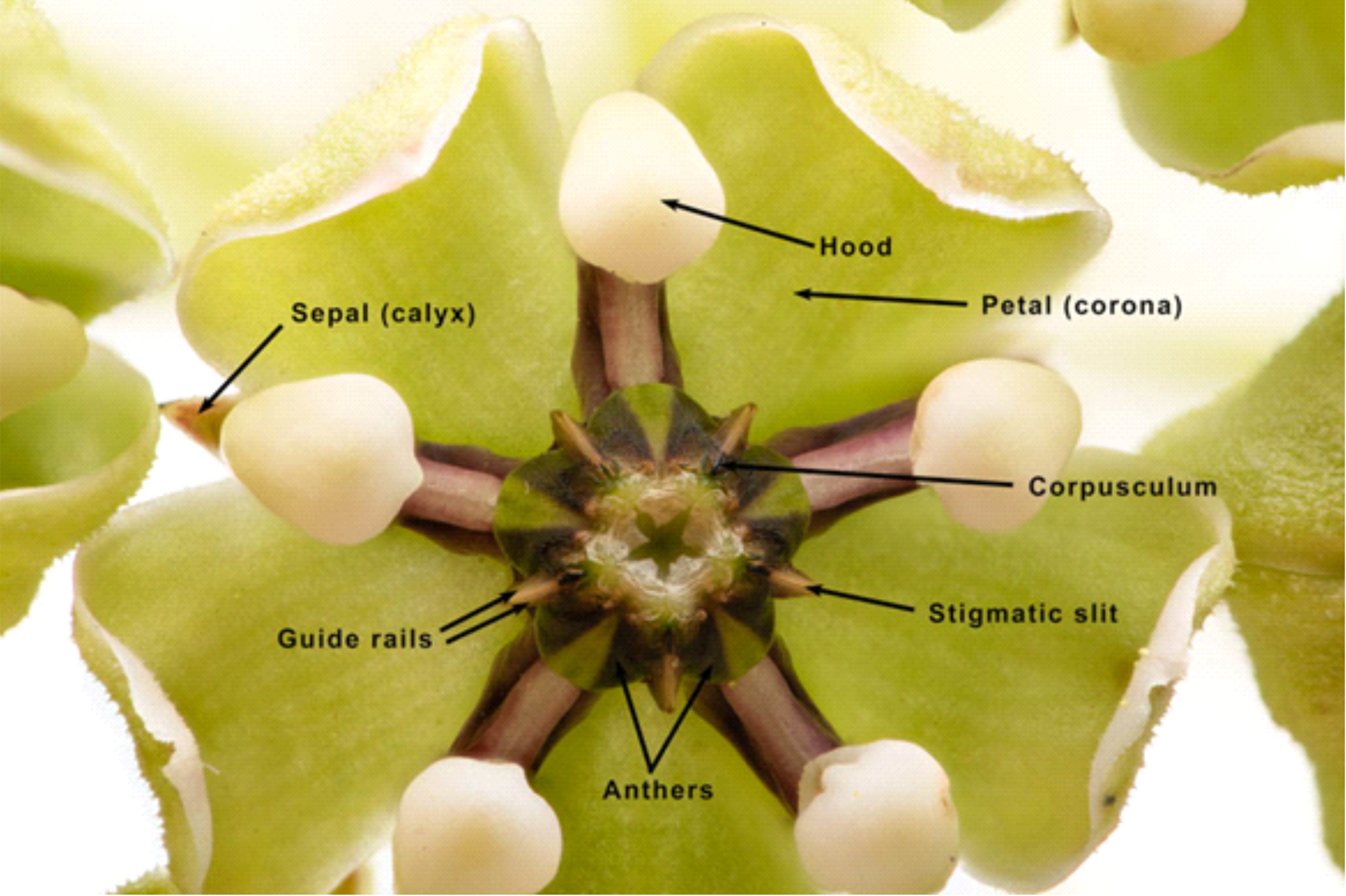
Parts of an antelope horns flower

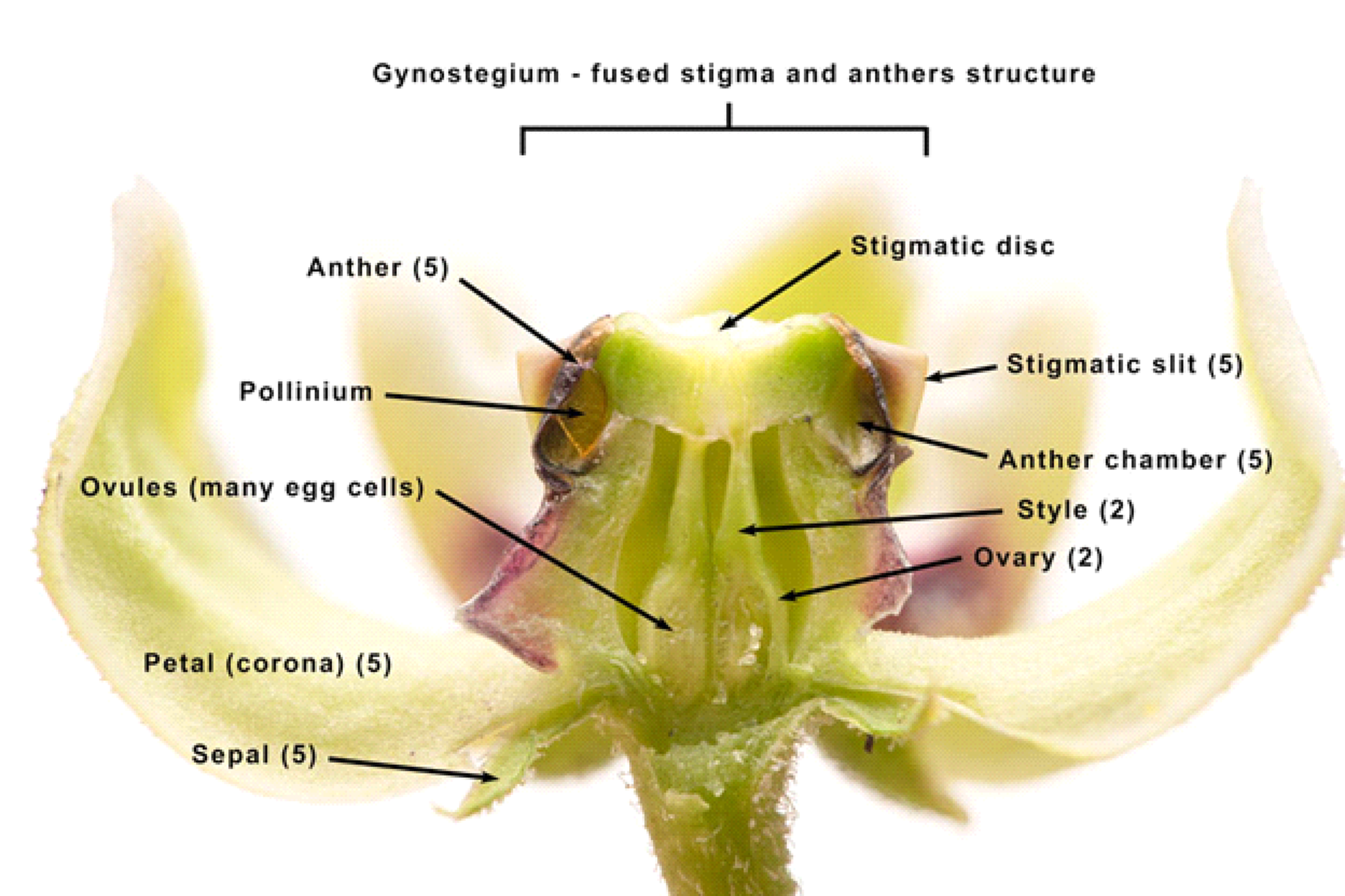
Cross section of a single antelope horns flower

The central circular structure is a gynostegium, the fusion of 2 stigma and 5 anthers. Antelope horns do not have individual pollen grains. The pollen sticks together as granular masses contained on a pollinarium structure located within each of the 5 stigmatic chambers. The pollinarium is made up of 2 pollinium “wings” connected to a central corpusculum via 2 translator arms. The picture "Antelope horns pollinarium" shows a pollinarium that was pulled out of the stigmatic slit using an insect pin.

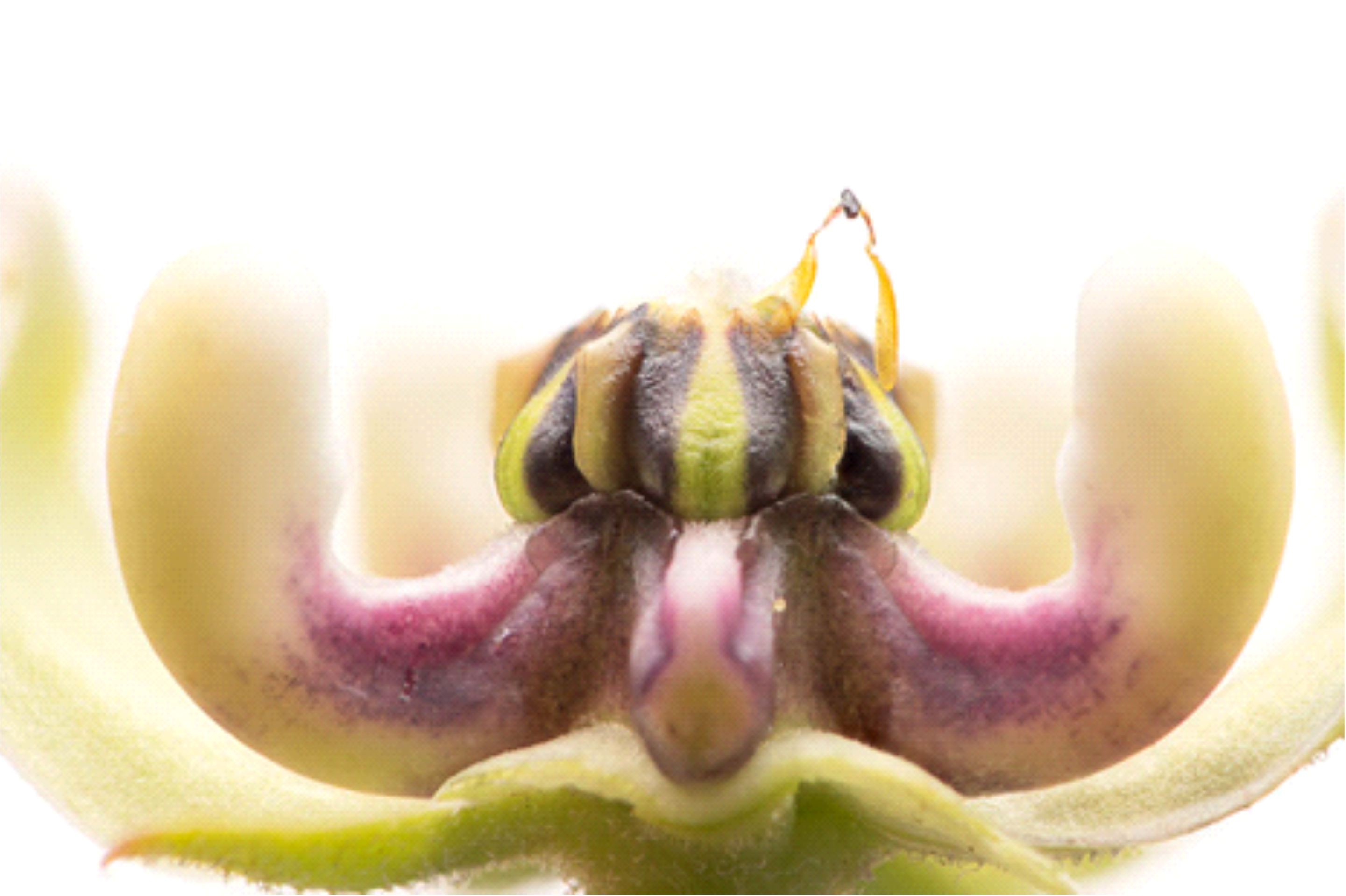
Antelope horns pollinarium

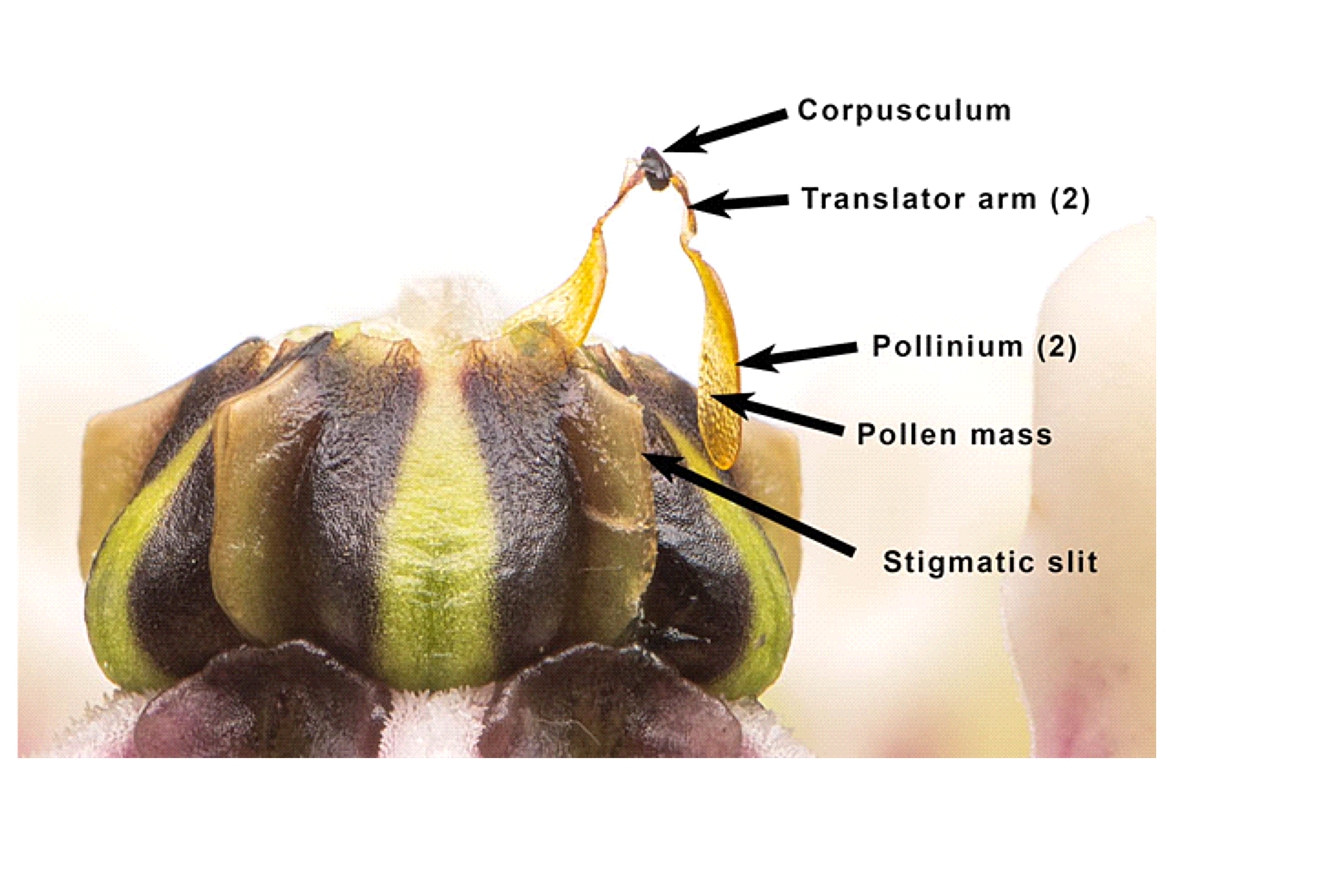
Parts of an Antelope horns pollinarium's

=== Antelope Horns pollination ===
Pollination of Antelope Horns happens when flowers are visited by insects that get their reward in nectar (in this case primarily sucrose) which is accessible at the base of each of the hoods. Several different types of insects visit milkweed searching for nectar including bees, butterflies, moths, flies and beetles. As they move around the flower in search of nectar one of their legs may slip into a stigmatic slit. The only way to safely remove their leg is to move it upwards toward the top of the slit. The leg can then snag on the corpusculum and pull out the entire pollinarium. When the insect visits another milkweed flower carrying this pollinarium, there is a chance a pollinium would slip into an empty stigmatic slit, dislodge, and remain there. If the orientation of the pollinium is correct and the concentration of nectar surrounding a pollinium is optimal, pollination will take place.

Pollen tubes grow out of a germination pore on the convex surface of the pollen mass on pollinium into the stigma and down one of the 2 styles to the ovary where the male genetic material fertilizes the (female) ovules. Each ovule has the potential to form one seed. The image "Antelope Horns pollen tube" shows the route pollen tubes take to transfer genetic material into an ovary. Asclepias asperula does not self-pollinate so they are dependent on attracting pollinators that will transfer pollen between plants.

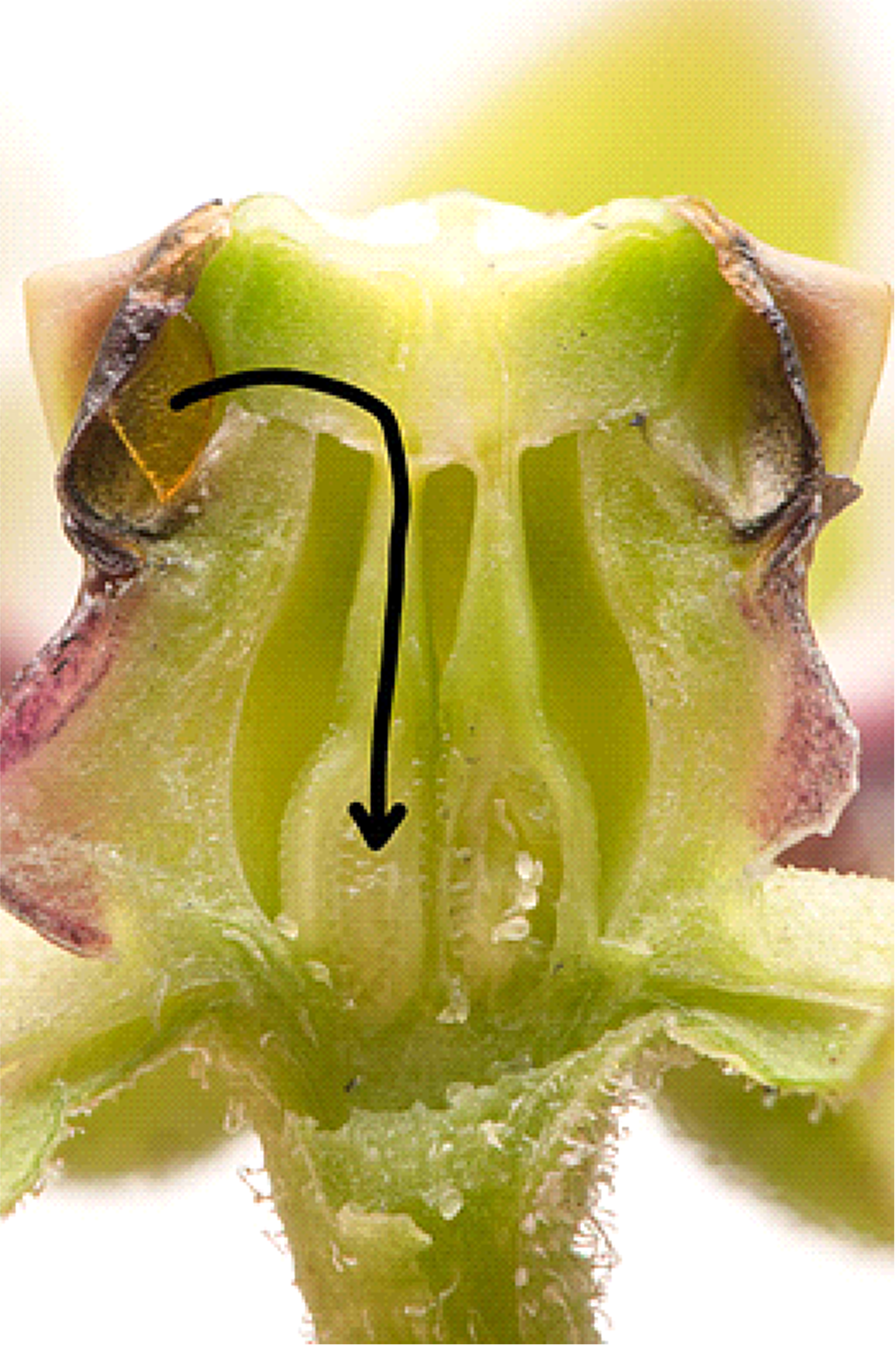
Antelope Horns pollen tube

== Taxonomy ==
Asclepias asperula is divided into two subspecies: A. asperula. ssp. asperula and A. asperula ssp. capricornu. Ssp. capricornu occurs in comparatively more mesic conditions and has comparatively broader leaves, floral crowns that are more white, and a more prostrate habit. Ssp. asperula occurs in comparatively more arid conditions and has comparatively narrower leaves, floral crowns that are more purple, and a more upright habit.

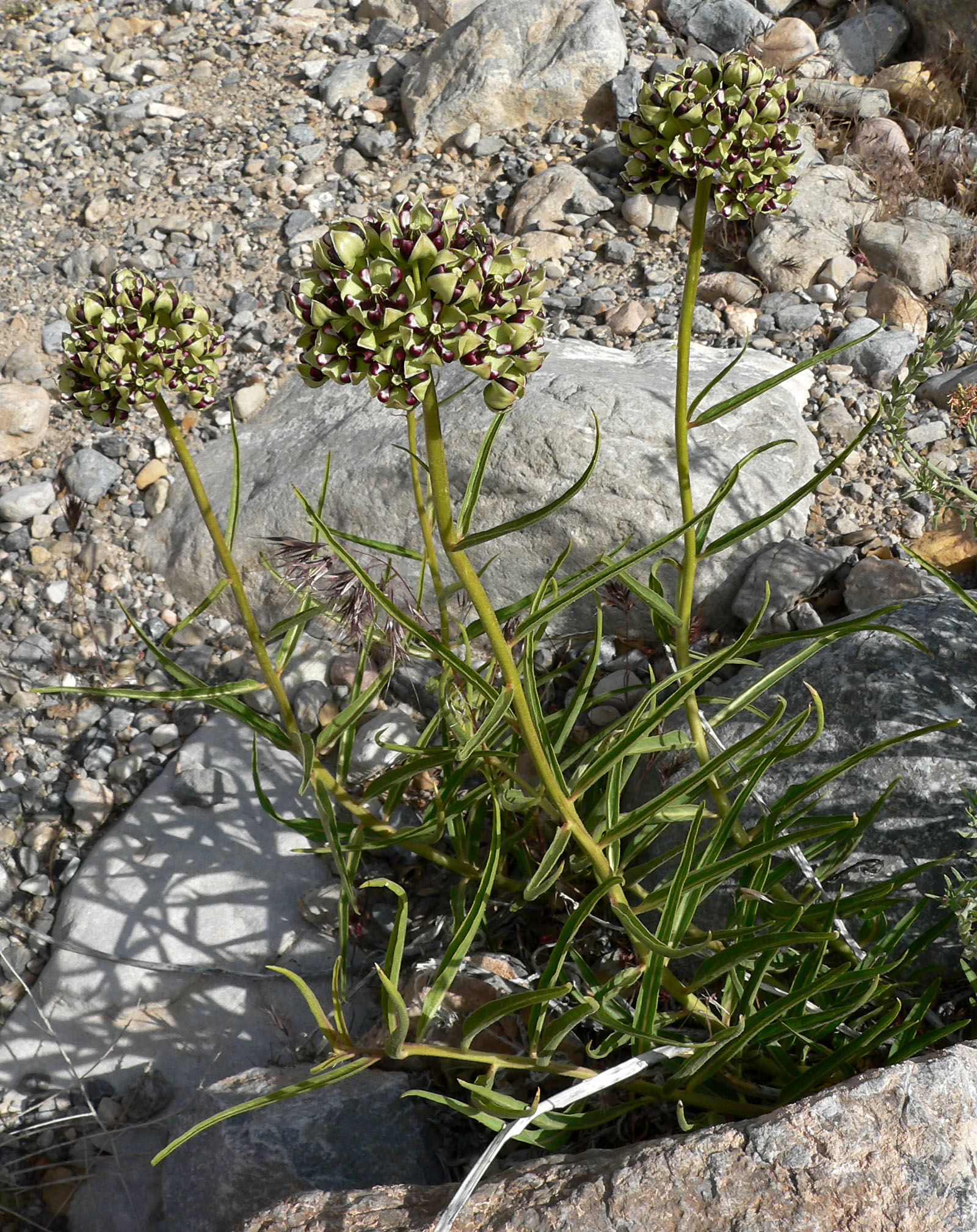
Subspecies A. a. asperula

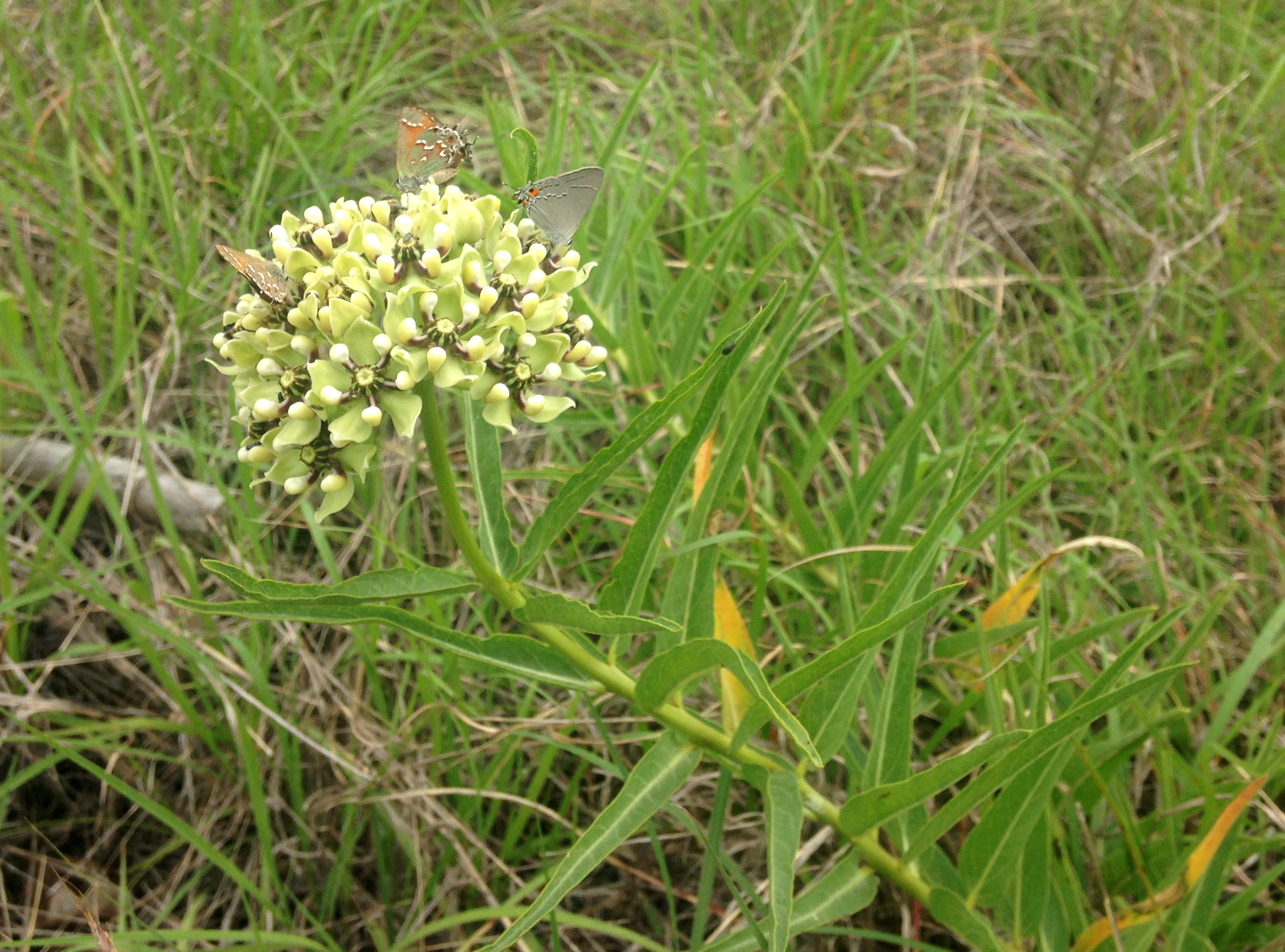
Subspecies A. a. capricornu

== Ecology ==
Like several other species of milkweed, A. asperula is a food for monarch butterfly caterpillars. It is one of the most important host plants in the southern United States for the generation of monarch butterflies that develop from eggs that monarchs have laid after spending the winter in Mexico.

Along with being food for monarchs, the plants also contain toxic cardiac glycosides (cardenolides) that the monarchs retain, making them unpalatable and poisonous to predators. For the same reason, A. asperula can be poisonous to livestock and other animals, including humans.

In addition to the monarch, it is a larval host to the dogbane tiger moth, the queen butterfly, and the unexpected cycnia.

== Cultivation ==
The plant is difficult to cultivate and does not grow well in containers. In cultivation, this species favors quickly draining soil that is high in inorganic matter, such as sand and rock chips. It can grow in loam and clay, if provided with adequate drainage and frequent dryness. Moisture level demands and tolerance depend upon the subspecies and possibly ecotype. The plant has a deep taproot, so it needs to have the deepest-possible pot if grown in a container and should not be waterlogged.
