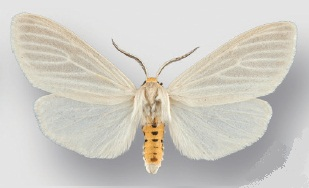
- Cycnia oregonensis oregonensis, male
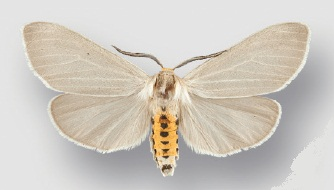
- Cycnia oregonensis tristis, male

Scientific classification
- Kingdom: Animalia
- Phylum: Arthropoda
- Class: Insecta
- Order: Lepidoptera
- Superfamily: Noctuoidea
- Family: Erebidae
- Subfamily: Arctiinae
- Genus: Cycnia
- Species: C. oregonensis

Binomial name
- Cycnia oregonensis (Stretch, 1873)

Synonyms
- Euchaetes oregonensis Stretch, 1873

= Cycnia oregonensis =

Species of moth

Cycnia oregonensis is a moth in the family Erebidae. It is found in most of North America, from coast to coast and from the border with Mexico north to central Saskatchewan and Nova Scotia.

The length of the forewings is 19–20 mm. Throughout most of its range, adults are nearly uniform in color and pattern. Subspecies tristis is limited to a small area near Olympia, Washington and is the only known population of this species in Washington west of the Cascades. It is distinctly grayer and less patterned than all other populations.

The larvae feed on Apocynum species.

== Subspecies ==
- Cycnia oregonensis oregonensis
- Cycnia oregonensis tristis Crabo, 2013 (Washington)
