= Euchaetes promathides =

Scientific classification
- Domain: Eukaryota
- Kingdom: Animalia
- Phylum: Arthropoda
- Class: Insecta
- Order: Lepidoptera
- Superfamily: Noctuoidea
- Family: Erebidae
- Subfamily: Arctiinae
- Genus: Euchaetes
- Species: E. promathides

Binomial name
- Euchaetes promathides (H. Druce, 1894)

Synonyms
- Eucereon promathides H. Druce, 1894

Species of moth

Euchaetes promathides is a moth of the family Erebidae. It was described by Herbert Druce in 1894. It is found in Mexico.
