= Euchaetes albaticosta =

Scientific classification
- Kingdom: Animalia
- Phylum: Arthropoda
- Class: Insecta
- Order: Lepidoptera
- Superfamily: Noctuoidea
- Family: Erebidae
- Subfamily: Arctiinae
- Genus: Euchaetes
- Species: E. albaticosta

Binomial name
- Euchaetes albaticosta (Dyar, 1912)

Synonyms
- Calidota albaticosta Dyar, 1912

Species of moth

Euchaetes albaticosta is a moth of the family Erebidae. It was described by Harrison Gray Dyar Jr. in 1912. It is found in Mexico.
