= Euchaetes expressa =

Scientific classification
- Domain: Eukaryota
- Kingdom: Animalia
- Phylum: Arthropoda
- Class: Insecta
- Order: Lepidoptera
- Superfamily: Noctuoidea
- Family: Erebidae
- Subfamily: Arctiinae
- Genus: Euchaetes
- Species: E. expressa

Binomial name
- Euchaetes expressa (H. Edwards, 1884)

Synonyms
- Antarctia expressa H. Edwards, 1884; Euchaetes rhadia Dyar, 1913; Euchaetes densa Dyar, 1921

Species of moth

Euchaetes expressa is a moth of the family Erebidae. It was described by Henry Edwards in 1884. It is found in Mexico and Costa Rica.
