= Cycnia sparsigutta =

Scientific classification
- Kingdom: Animalia
- Phylum: Arthropoda
- Class: Insecta
- Order: Lepidoptera
- Superfamily: Noctuoidea
- Family: Erebidae
- Subfamily: Arctiinae
- Genus: Cycnia
- Species: C. sparsigutta

Binomial name
- Cycnia sparsigutta Walker, 1864

Species of moth

Cycnia sparsigutta is a moth of the family Erebidae. It was described by Francis Walker in 1864. It is found in Sri Lanka.
