= Euchaetes bicolor =

Scientific classification
- Domain: Eukaryota
- Kingdom: Animalia
- Phylum: Arthropoda
- Class: Insecta
- Order: Lepidoptera
- Superfamily: Noctuoidea
- Family: Erebidae
- Subfamily: Arctiinae
- Genus: Euchaetes
- Species: E. bicolor

Binomial name
- Euchaetes bicolor (Rothschild, 1935)

Synonyms
- Euchaetias bicolor Rothschild, 1935

Species of moth

Euchaetes bicolor is a moth of the family Erebidae. It was described by Walter Rothschild in 1935. It is found in São Paulo, Brazil.
