= Euchaetes antica =

Scientific classification
- Kingdom: Animalia
- Phylum: Arthropoda
- Class: Insecta
- Order: Lepidoptera
- Superfamily: Noctuoidea
- Family: Erebidae
- Subfamily: Arctiinae
- Genus: Euchaetes
- Species: E. antica

Binomial name
- Euchaetes antica (Walker, 1856)

Synonyms
- Halysidota antica Walker, 1856; Ctenucha salatis Boisduval, 1870; Ctenucha pollinia Boisduval, 1870; Euchaetes zonalis Grote, 1882; Euchaetes parazona Dyar, 1912; Euchaetes sinaloensis Dyar, 1921

Species of moth

Euchaetes antica is a moth of the family Erebidae. It was described by Francis Walker in 1856. It is found from Arizona and New Mexico in the US, south to Mexico, Nicaragua, Honduras and Guatemala.

The length of the forewing is 13–15 mm for males and 16–20 mm for females.

The larvae feed on Asclepias subverticillata.
