= Euchaetes elegans =

Scientific classification
- Domain: Eukaryota
- Kingdom: Animalia
- Phylum: Arthropoda
- Class: Insecta
- Order: Lepidoptera
- Superfamily: Noctuoidea
- Family: Erebidae
- Subfamily: Arctiinae
- Genus: Euchaetes
- Species: E. elegans

Binomial name
- Euchaetes elegans Stretch, 1874

Synonyms
- Euchaetes elegans Stretch, 1875; Cycnia elegans; Pygarctia elegans

Species of insect

Euchaetes elegans, the elegant pygarctia, is a moth of the family Erebidae. It was described by Richard Harper Stretch in 1874. It is found in the US states of California, Arizona, New Mexico, Nevada and Texas, and in Mexico, Guatemala, Panama and Colombia.

Adults are on wing from July to September.

The larvae feed on Asclepias species.
