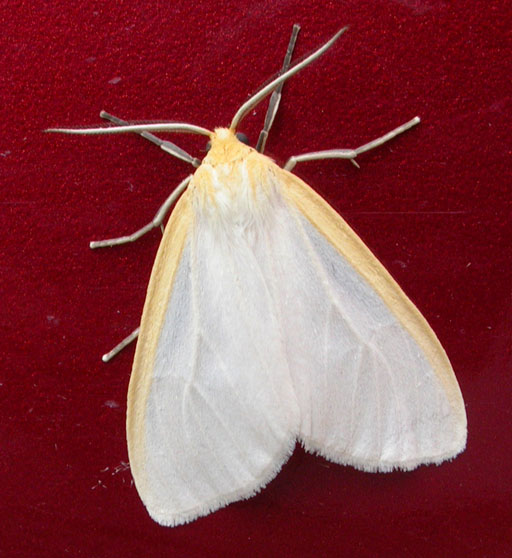
- Cycnia tenera

Scientific classification
- Kingdom: Animalia
- Phylum: Arthropoda
- Clade: Pancrustacea
- Class: Insecta
- Order: Lepidoptera
- Superfamily: Noctuoidea
- Family: Erebidae
- Subfamily: Arctiinae
- Subtribe: Phaegopterina
- Genus: Cycnia; Hübner, 1818

Synonyms
- Tanada Walker, 1856

= Cycnia =

Genus of insects

Cycnia is a genus of tiger moths in the family Erebidae. The genus was erected by Jacob Hübner in 1818.

== Species ==
- Cycnia collaris (Fitch, 1857)
- Cycnia inopinatus H. Edwards, 1882 – unexpected cycnia
- Cycnia niveola Strand, 1919
- Cycnia oregonensis Stretch, 1874 – Oregon cycnia
- Cycnia tenera Hübner, 1818 – delicate cycnia
- "Cycnia" rubida Walker, 1864
- "Cycnia" sparsigutta Walker, 1864
