= Euchaetes cressida =

Scientific classification
- Kingdom: Animalia
- Phylum: Arthropoda
- Class: Insecta
- Order: Lepidoptera
- Superfamily: Noctuoidea
- Family: Erebidae
- Subfamily: Arctiinae
- Genus: Euchaetes
- Species: E. cressida

Binomial name
- Euchaetes cressida Dyar, 1913

Synonyms
- Euchaetes helena Cassino, 1928

Species of moth

Euchaetes cressida is a moth of the family Erebidae. It was described by Harrison Gray Dyar Jr. in 1913. It is found in the US state of Texas and Mexico.

The wingspan is about 33 mm.
