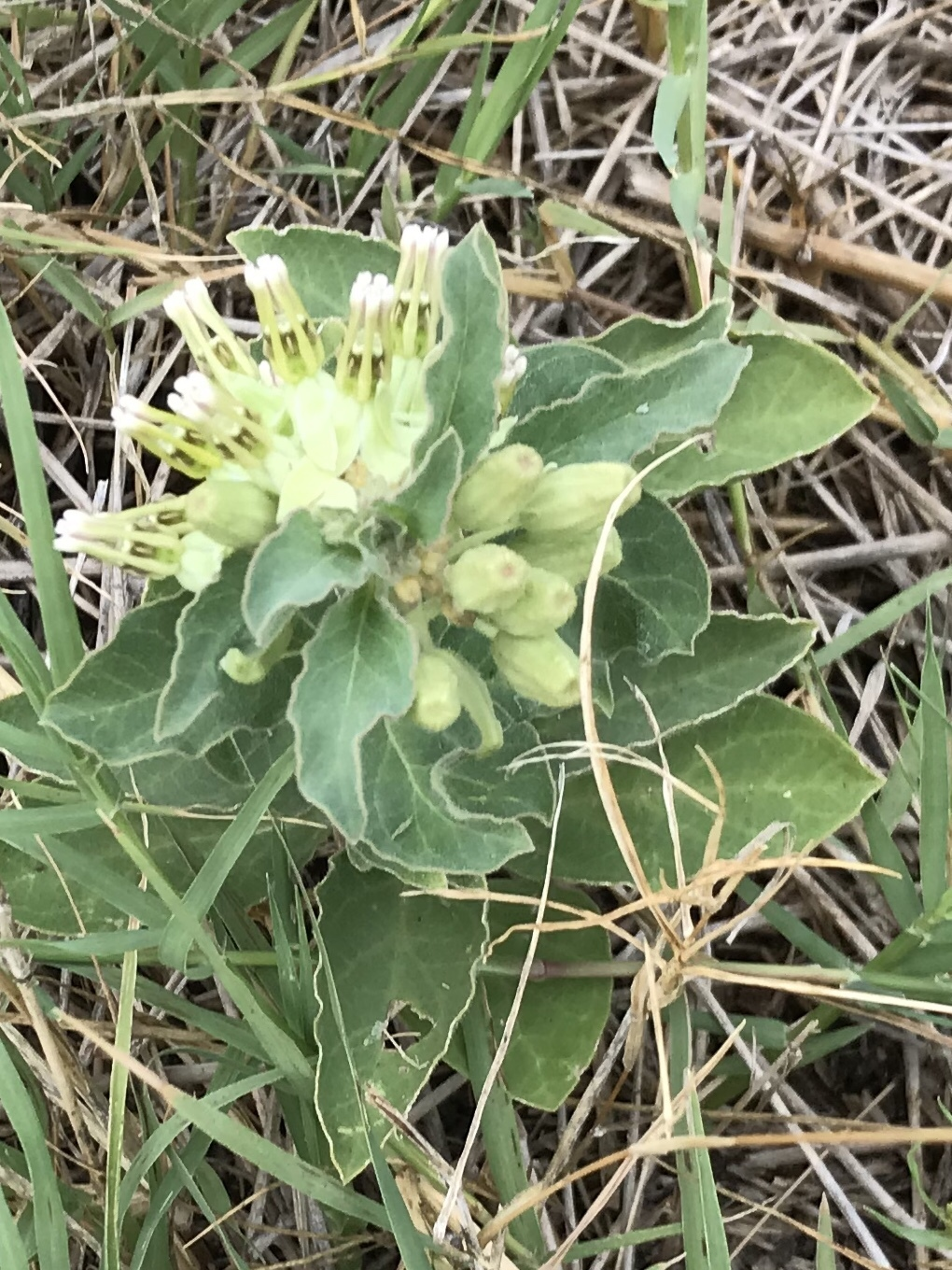

Conservation status
- Apparently Secure (NatureServe)

Scientific classification
- Kingdom: Plantae
- Clade: Tracheophytes
- Clade: Angiosperms
- Clade: Eudicots
- Clade: Asterids
- Order: Gentianales
- Family: Apocynaceae
- Genus: Asclepias
- Species: A. oenotheroides

Binomial name
- Asclepias oenotheroides Schltdl. & Cham.

Synonyms
- List: Asclepias brevicornu; Asclepias lindheimeri; Asclepias longicornu; Podostemma australe; Podostemma helleri; Podostemma lindheimeri; Podostemma longicornu

= Asclepias oenotheroides =

Plant species in the dogbane family

Asclepias oenotheroides, commonly known as zizotes milkweed or sidecluster milkweed, is a plant in the dogbane family. It grows in Central America, Mexico, and several US states.

== Description ==
Zizotes milkweed is a small plant with one to seven stems that usually are unbranched, but occasionally may branch near the base. Each stem is 10 to 50 centimeters (4–20 in) long and spread outward from the crown or rest upon the ground. The stems are somewhat to very thickly covered in curving hairs. It is a perennial plant with a rhizome, a modified underground stem.

The leaves are attached to opposite sides of the stems, or nearly so, and are egg shaped in outline, somewhat rectangular with rounded corners, or a rounded triangle. They measure 4–11 cm (1.5–4.5 in) long and 1.2–6.5 cm (0.5–2.5 in) wide and sometimes have a somewhat wavy edge.

The inflorescences are umbel, having all the flower stalks attached together at one point resembling the ribs of an umbrella, with the umbels low down on the stems attached by a peduncle and those high up attaching directly to the stem or nearly so. The five petals of each flower are fused at their bases and the lobes are greenish-white. Flowering can start as early as February, though usually not until March, and can occur as late as November.

== Taxonomy ==
Asclepias oenotheroides was scientifically described and named in 1830 by Diederich Franz Leonhard von Schlechtendal and Adelbert von Chamisso. It is classified in the genus Asclepias as part of the family Apocynaceae. It has seven heterotypic synonyms.

Table of Synonyms
Name	Year
Asclepias brevicornu Scheele	1848
Asclepias lindheimeri Engelm. & A.Gray	1850
Asclepias longicornu Benth.	1839
Podostemma australe Greene	1897
Podostemma helleri Greene	1897
Podostemma lindheimeri (Engelm. & A.Gray) Greene	1897
Podostemma longicornu (Benth.) Greene	1897

=== Names ===
The species name, oenotheroides, is Botanical Latin meaning "looking like evening primrose" a compound word from the genus name Oenothera and the Greek word eidos (εἶδος). It is known by the common names zizotes milkweed, sidecluster milkweed, longhood milkweed, or primrose milkweed. Though it is sometime called green milkweed Asclepias viridis is frequently known by this name. It is also called hierba de zizotes in south Texas.

In the Mayan language it is called kabalkꞌ umche'.

== Range and habitat ==
Zizotes milkweed is native to North America from the Colorado and Louisiana in the United States to Costa Rica. In Central America it is native to every country except for Belize and Panama. It is widespread in Mexico, growing in 24 of the 36 states. In the United States it is found in Arizona, New Mexico, Colorado, Oklahoma, Texas, and Louisiana. It is widespread in Texas, especially in the southern half of the state. In New Mexico it is much less common, only being recorded in Chaves, Santa Fe, and San Miguel counties. Likewise it is recorded in just Blaine and Major counties in Oklahoma. In the three other US states it is found in just one county in each, Jefferson Parish, Louisiana, Las Animas County, Colorado, and Cochise County, Arizona.

== Ecology ==
In the southern United States zizotes milkweed is an important host species for the monarch butterfly alongside Asclepias viridis and Asclepias asperula.
