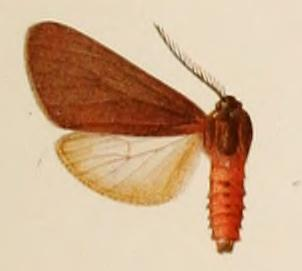

Scientific classification
- Domain: Eukaryota
- Kingdom: Animalia
- Phylum: Arthropoda
- Class: Insecta
- Order: Lepidoptera
- Superfamily: Noctuoidea
- Family: Erebidae
- Subfamily: Arctiinae
- Genus: Euchaetes
- Species: E. fusca

Binomial name
- Euchaetes fusca (Rothschild, 1910)

Synonyms
- Pygarctia fusca Rothschild, 1910

= Euchaetes fusca =

Species of moth

Euchaetes fusca is a moth of the family Erebidae. It is found from the south-western United States (including California and Arizona) to Costa Rica.

The wingspan is about 34 mm.
