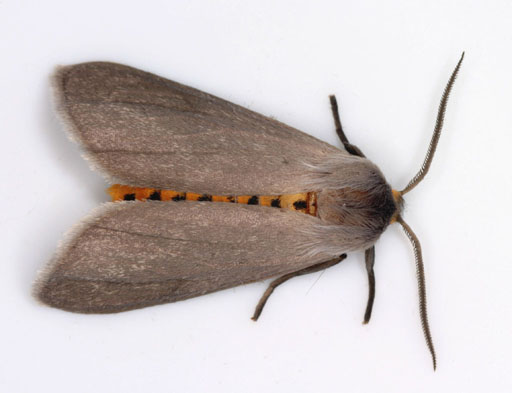
- Euchaetes egle

Scientific classification
- Domain: Eukaryota
- Kingdom: Animalia
- Phylum: Arthropoda
- Class: Insecta
- Order: Lepidoptera
- Superfamily: Noctuoidea
- Family: Erebidae
- Subfamily: Arctiinae
- Subtribe: Phaegopterina
- Genus: Euchaetes; Harris, 1841

Type species
- Phalaena egle Drury, 1773

Synonyms
- Stenophaea Hampson, 1901; Protomolis Hampson, 1901; Euchaetias Lyman, 1902

= Euchaetes =

Genus of moths

Euchaetes is a genus of moths in the family Erebidae. It was described by Thaddeus William Harris in 1841.

== Species ==
- Euchaetes albaticosta (Dyar, 1912)
- Euchaetes albicosta (Walker, 1855)
- Euchaetes antica (Walker, 1856)
- Euchaetes bicolor (Rothschild, 1935)
- Euchaetes bolteri (Stretch, 1885)
- Euchaetes castalla (Barnes & McDunnough, 1910)
- Euchaetes cressida (Dyar, 1913)
- Euchaetes egle (Drury, 1773) – milkweed tiger moth
- Euchaetes elegans (Stretch, 1874)
- Euchaetes expressa (H. Edwards, 1884)
- Euchaetes fusca (Rothschild, 1910)
- Euchaetes gigantea (Barnes & McDunnough, 1910)
- Euchaetes mitis Schaus, 1910
- Euchaetes pannycha (Dyar, 1918)
- Euchaetes perlevis (Grote, 1882)
- Euchaetes polingi (Cassino, 1928)
- Euchaetes promathides (Druce, 1894)
- Euchaetes psara (Dyar, 1907)
- Euchaetes rizoma (Schaus, 1896)
- Euchaetes zella (Dyar, 1903)
