= Euchaetes castalla =

Scientific classification
- Domain: Eukaryota
- Kingdom: Animalia
- Phylum: Arthropoda
- Class: Insecta
- Order: Lepidoptera
- Superfamily: Noctuoidea
- Family: Erebidae
- Subfamily: Arctiinae
- Genus: Euchaetes
- Species: E. castalla

Binomial name
- Euchaetes castalla Barnes & McDunnough, 1910

Synonyms
- Euchaetes castalla ab. griseopunctata Barnes & McDunnough, 1910

Species of moth

Euchaetes castalla is a moth of the family Erebidae. It was described by William Barnes and James Halliday McDunnough in 1910. It is found in the US state of Arizona.

The wingspan is about 41 mm.
