= Cycnia rubida =

Scientific classification
- Kingdom: Animalia
- Phylum: Arthropoda
- Class: Insecta
- Order: Lepidoptera
- Superfamily: Noctuoidea
- Family: Erebidae
- Subfamily: Arctiinae
- Genus: Cycnia
- Species: C. rubida

Binomial name
- Cycnia rubida Walker, 1864

Species of moth

Cycnia rubida is a moth of the family Erebidae. It was described by Francis Walker in 1864. It is found in Sri Lanka.
