= Euchaetes perlevis =

Scientific classification
- Kingdom: Animalia
- Phylum: Arthropoda
- Class: Insecta
- Order: Lepidoptera
- Superfamily: Noctuoidea
- Family: Erebidae
- Subfamily: Arctiinae
- Genus: Euchaetes
- Species: E. perlevis

Binomial name
- Euchaetes perlevis Grote, 1882

Species of moth

Euchaetes perlevis is a moth of the family Erebidae. It was described by Augustus Radcliffe Grote in 1882. It is found in the US states of Arizona, New Mexico and Texas.

The wingspan is about 23 mm.
