= Cycnia niveola =

Scientific classification
- Domain: Eukaryota
- Kingdom: Animalia
- Phylum: Arthropoda
- Class: Insecta
- Order: Lepidoptera
- Superfamily: Noctuoidea
- Family: Erebidae
- Subfamily: Arctiinae
- Genus: Cycnia
- Species: C. niveola

Binomial name
- Cycnia niveola (Strand, 1919)

Synonyms
- Diacrisia niveola Strand, 1919; Euchaetes nivea Maassen, 1890 (preocc. Dionychopus nivea Menetries, 1859)

Species of moth

Cycnia niveola is a moth of the family Erebidae. It was described by Embrik Strand in 1919. It is found in Ecuador.
