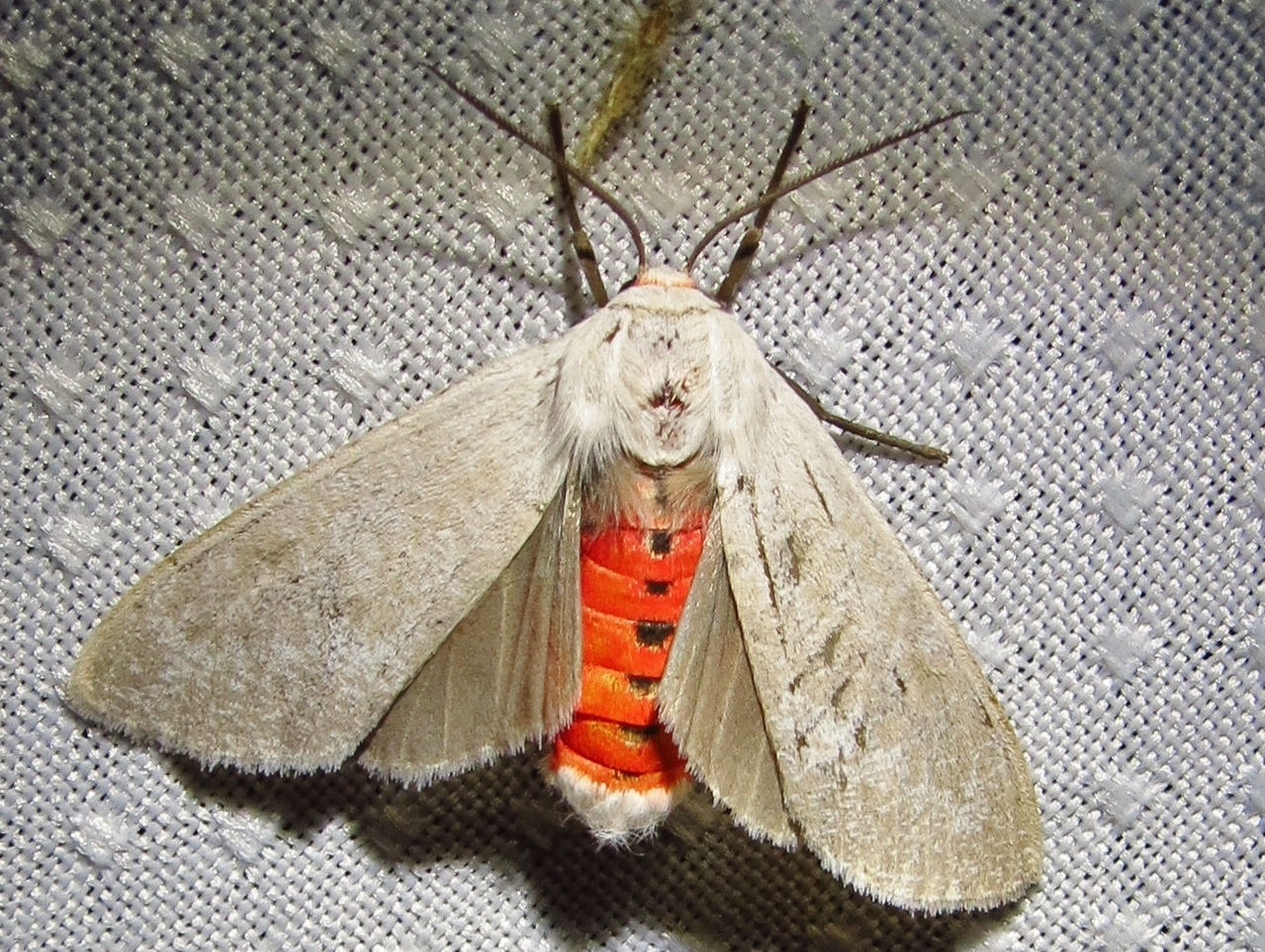

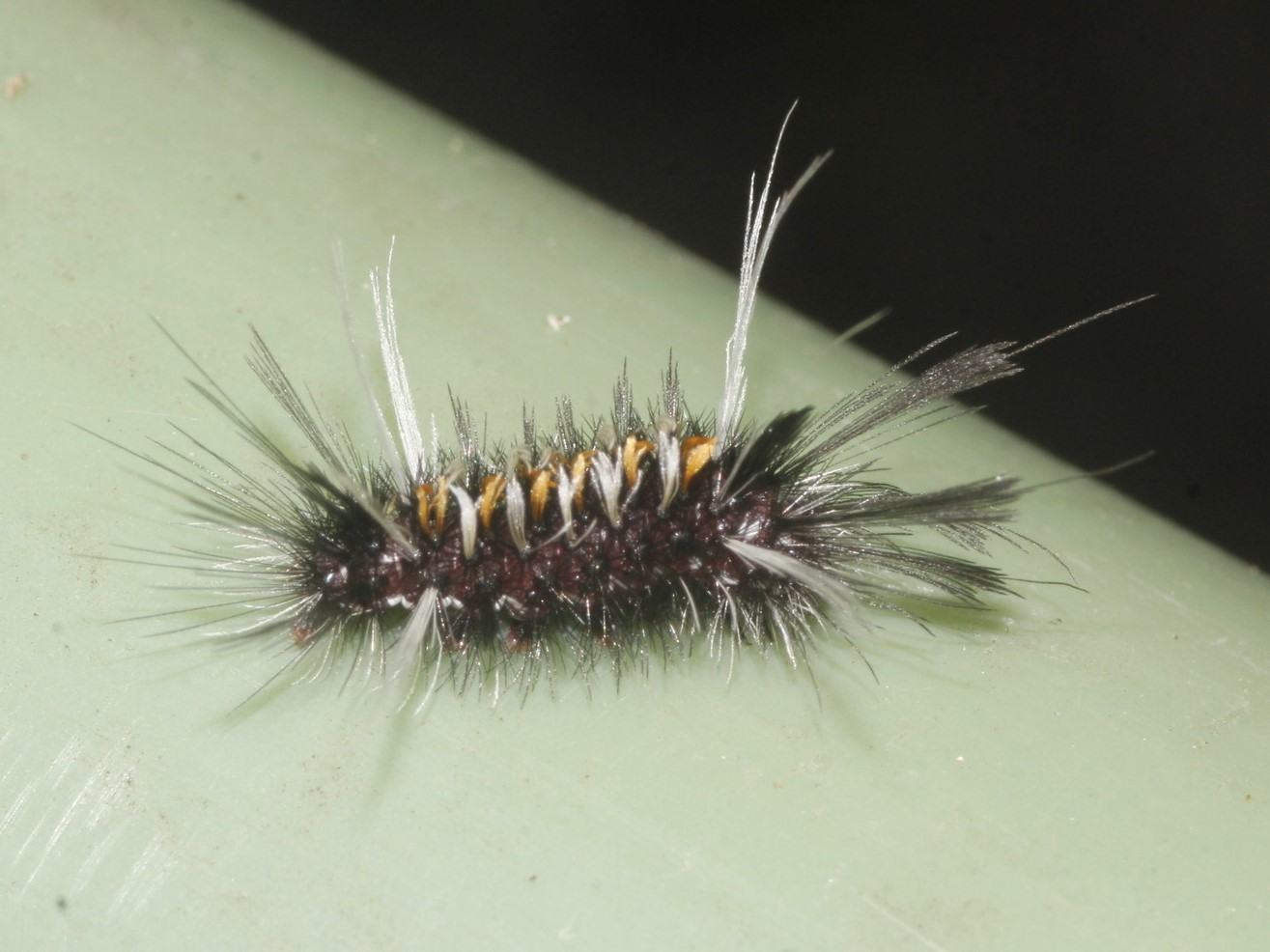
- Adult (top) and larva (bottom)

Scientific classification
- Domain: Eukaryota
- Kingdom: Animalia
- Phylum: Arthropoda
- Class: Insecta
- Order: Lepidoptera
- Superfamily: Noctuoidea
- Family: Erebidae
- Subfamily: Arctiinae
- Genus: Euchaetes
- Species: E. bolteri

Binomial name
- Euchaetes bolteri (Stretch, 1885)

Synonyms
- List: Euchaetes bolteri Stretch, 1885; Euchaetes epagoga Dyar, 1913; Euchaetes jalapa Strand, 1919; Euchaetes costaricae Strand, 1919; Euchaetes crassipyga Strand, 1921; Euchaetes scepsiformis Graef, 1887

= Euchaetes bolteri =

Species of moth

Euchaetes bolteri is a species of moth in the family Erebidae. It was described by Richard Harper Stretch in 1885. It is found from the south-western US (Texas and New Mexico) to Mexico and Costa Rica.

Adults have been recorded on wing from late March to May.
