= Euchaetes pannycha =

Scientific classification
- Kingdom: Animalia
- Phylum: Arthropoda
- Class: Insecta
- Order: Lepidoptera
- Superfamily: Noctuoidea
- Family: Erebidae
- Subfamily: Arctiinae
- Genus: Euchaetes
- Species: E. pannycha

Binomial name
- Euchaetes pannycha (Dyar, 1918)

Synonyms
- Pericallia pannycha Dyar, 1918

Species of moth

Euchaetes pannycha is a moth of the family Erebidae. It was described by Harrison Gray Dyar Jr. in 1918. It is found in Mexico.
