= Euchaetes albicosta =

Scientific classification
- Kingdom: Animalia
- Phylum: Arthropoda
- Class: Insecta
- Order: Lepidoptera
- Superfamily: Noctuoidea
- Family: Erebidae
- Subfamily: Arctiinae
- Genus: Euchaetes
- Species: E. albicosta

Binomial name
- Euchaetes albicosta (Walker, 1855)

Synonyms
- Phragmatobia albicosta Walker, 1855; Euchaetes fumidus H. Edwards, 1884

Species of moth

Euchaetes albicosta is a moth of the family Erebidae. It was described by Francis Walker in 1855. It is found from Texas, south to Mexico and Nicaragua.
