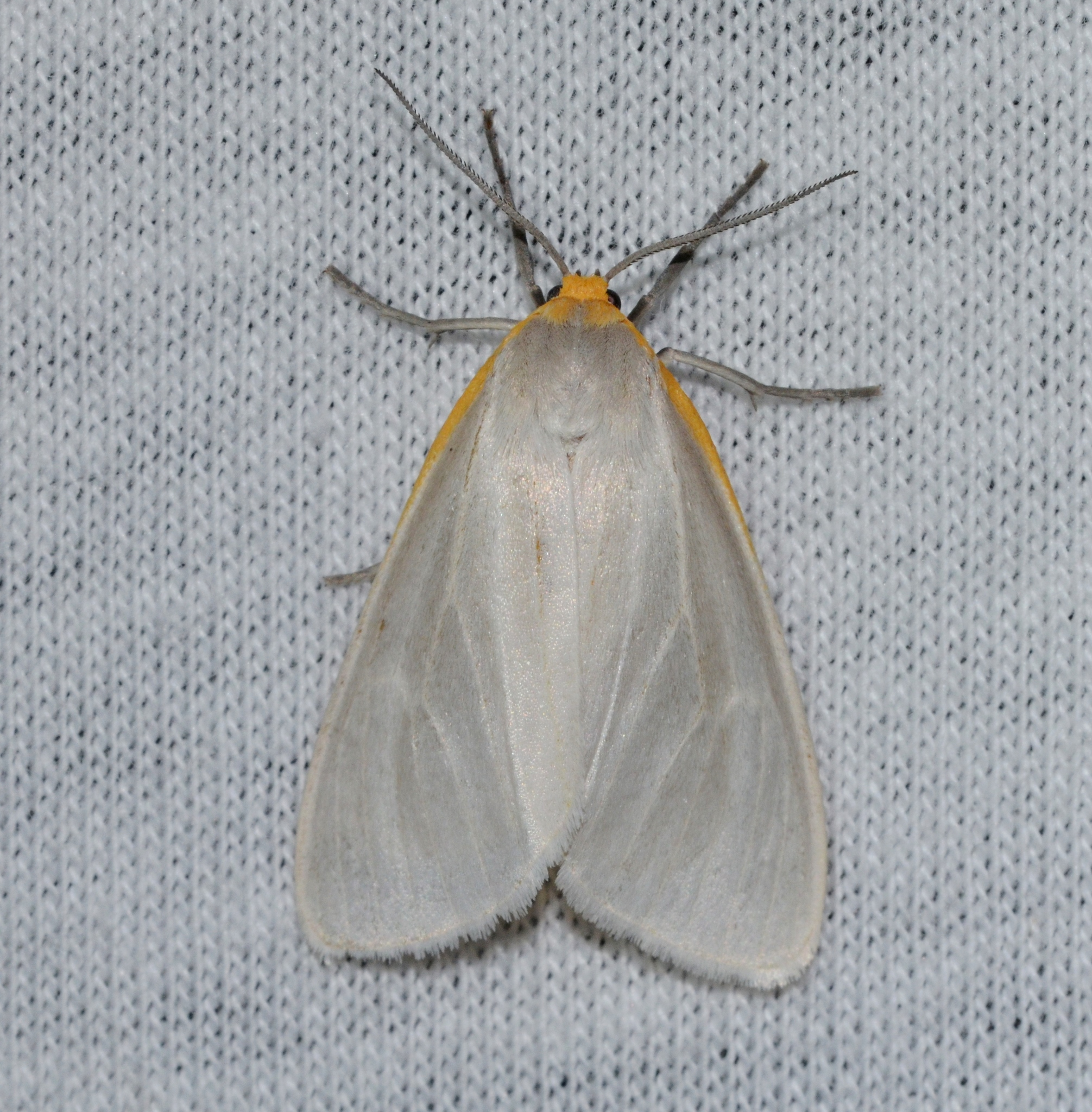

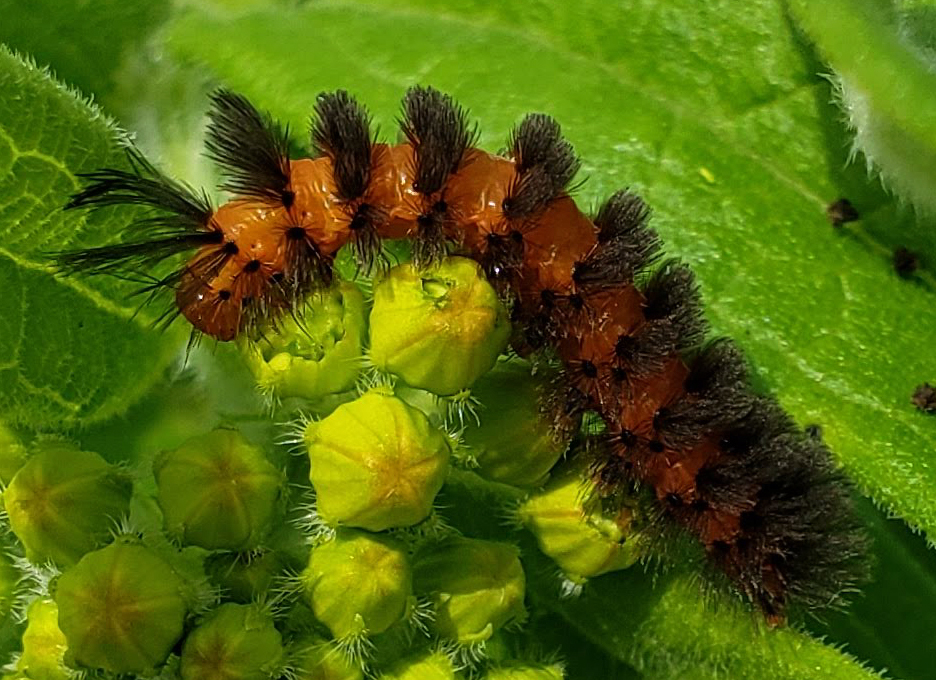
- Adult (top), and larva (lower)

Scientific classification
- Domain: Eukaryota
- Kingdom: Animalia
- Phylum: Arthropoda
- Class: Insecta
- Order: Lepidoptera
- Superfamily: Noctuoidea
- Family: Erebidae
- Subfamily: Arctiinae
- Genus: Cycnia
- Species: C. collaris

Binomial name
- Cycnia collaris (Fitch, 1857)

Synonyms
- Hyphantria collaris Fitch, 1857; Euchaetes pudens H. Edwards, 1882

= Cycnia collaris =

Species of moth

Cycnia collaris is a moth of the family Erebidae. It was described by Asa Fitch in 1857. It is found in the United States from Arizona to Florida.

Adults are on wing in April and October, possibly in two generations per year.
