= Euchaetes polingi =

Scientific classification
- Kingdom: Animalia
- Phylum: Arthropoda
- Clade: Pancrustacea
- Class: Insecta
- Order: Lepidoptera
- Superfamily: Noctuoidea
- Family: Erebidae
- Subfamily: Arctiinae
- Genus: Euchaetes
- Species: E. polingi

Binomial name
- Euchaetes polingi Cassino, 1928

Species of moth

Euchaetes polingi is a moth of the family Erebidae. It was described by Samuel E. Cassino in 1928. It is found in the US states of Arizona, New Mexico, Oklahoma and Texas.
