= Euchaetes rizoma =

Scientific classification
- Domain: Eukaryota
- Kingdom: Animalia
- Phylum: Arthropoda
- Class: Insecta
- Order: Lepidoptera
- Superfamily: Noctuoidea
- Family: Erebidae
- Subfamily: Arctiinae
- Genus: Euchaetes
- Species: E. rizoma

Binomial name
- Euchaetes rizoma (Schaus, 1896)

Synonyms
- Phaegoptera rizoma Schaus, 1896

Species of moth

Euchaetes rizoma is a moth of the family Erebidae. It was described by William Schaus in 1896. It is found in Brazil.
