= Euchaetes psara =

Scientific classification
- Kingdom: Animalia
- Phylum: Arthropoda
- Class: Insecta
- Order: Lepidoptera
- Superfamily: Noctuoidea
- Family: Erebidae
- Subfamily: Arctiinae
- Genus: Euchaetes
- Species: E. psara

Binomial name
- Euchaetes psara Dyar, 1907

Species of moth

Euchaetes psara is a moth of the family Erebidae. It was described by Harrison Gray Dyar Jr. in 1907. It is found in Mexico.
