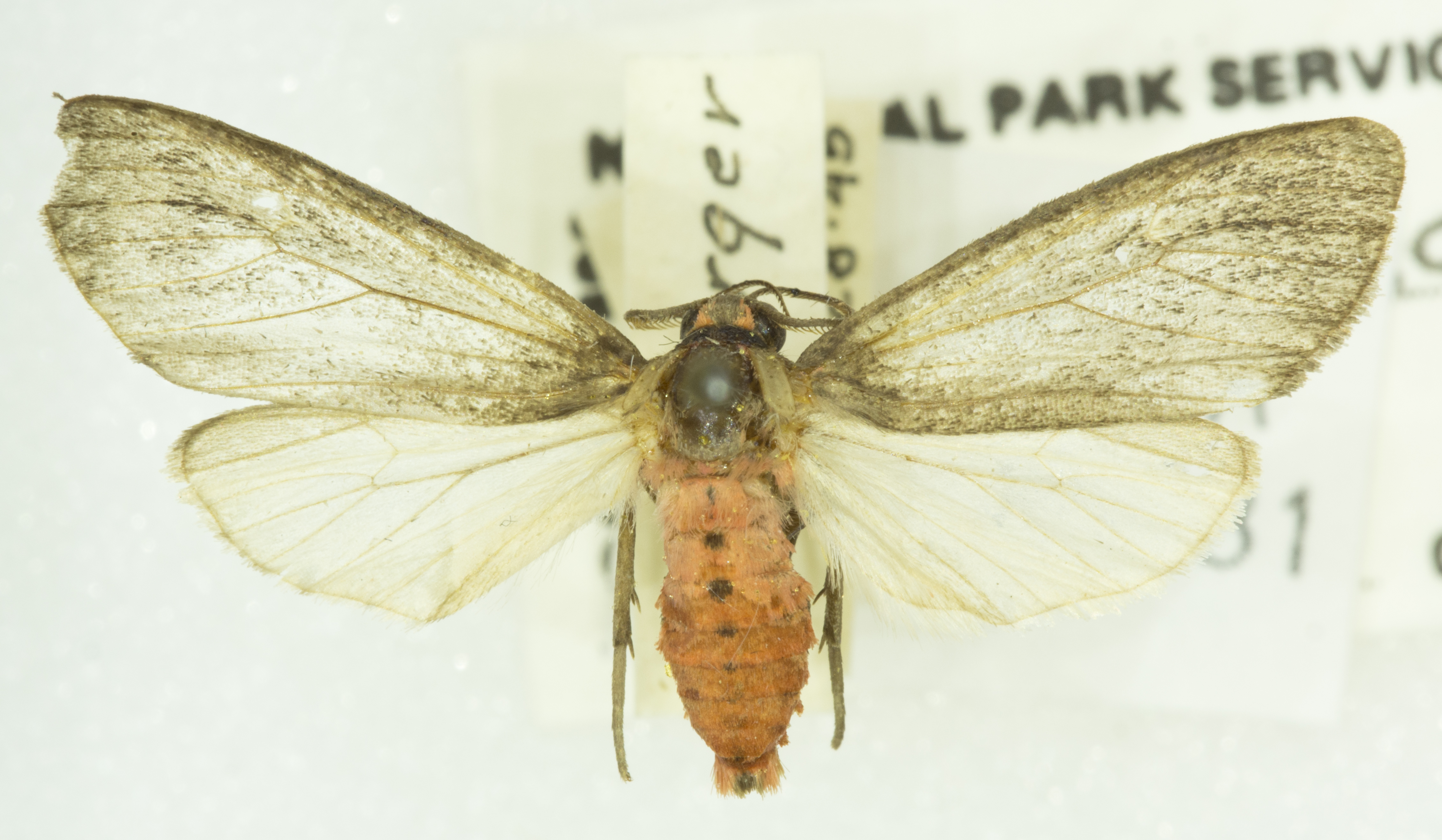

Scientific classification
- Domain: Eukaryota
- Kingdom: Animalia
- Phylum: Arthropoda
- Class: Insecta
- Order: Lepidoptera
- Superfamily: Noctuoidea
- Family: Erebidae
- Subfamily: Arctiinae
- Genus: Euchaetes
- Species: E. zella

Binomial name
- Euchaetes zella (Dyar, 1903)

Synonyms
- Calidota zella Dyar, [1903]

= Euchaetes zella =

Species of moth

Euchaetes zella is a moth of the family Erebidae. It was described by Harrison Gray Dyar Jr. in 1903. It is found in the US states of Arizona, California, Nevada, New Mexico, Oklahoma and Texas.

The wingspan is about 26 mm.
