= Euchaetes gigantea =

Scientific classification
- Domain: Eukaryota
- Kingdom: Animalia
- Phylum: Arthropoda
- Class: Insecta
- Order: Lepidoptera
- Superfamily: Noctuoidea
- Family: Erebidae
- Subfamily: Arctiinae
- Genus: Euchaetes
- Species: E. gigantea

Binomial name
- Euchaetes gigantea Barnes & McDunnough, 1910

Species of moth

Euchaetes gigantea is a moth of the family Erebidae. It was described by William Barnes and James Halliday McDunnough in 1910. It is found in the US states of Arizona, New Mexico and Oklahoma.
