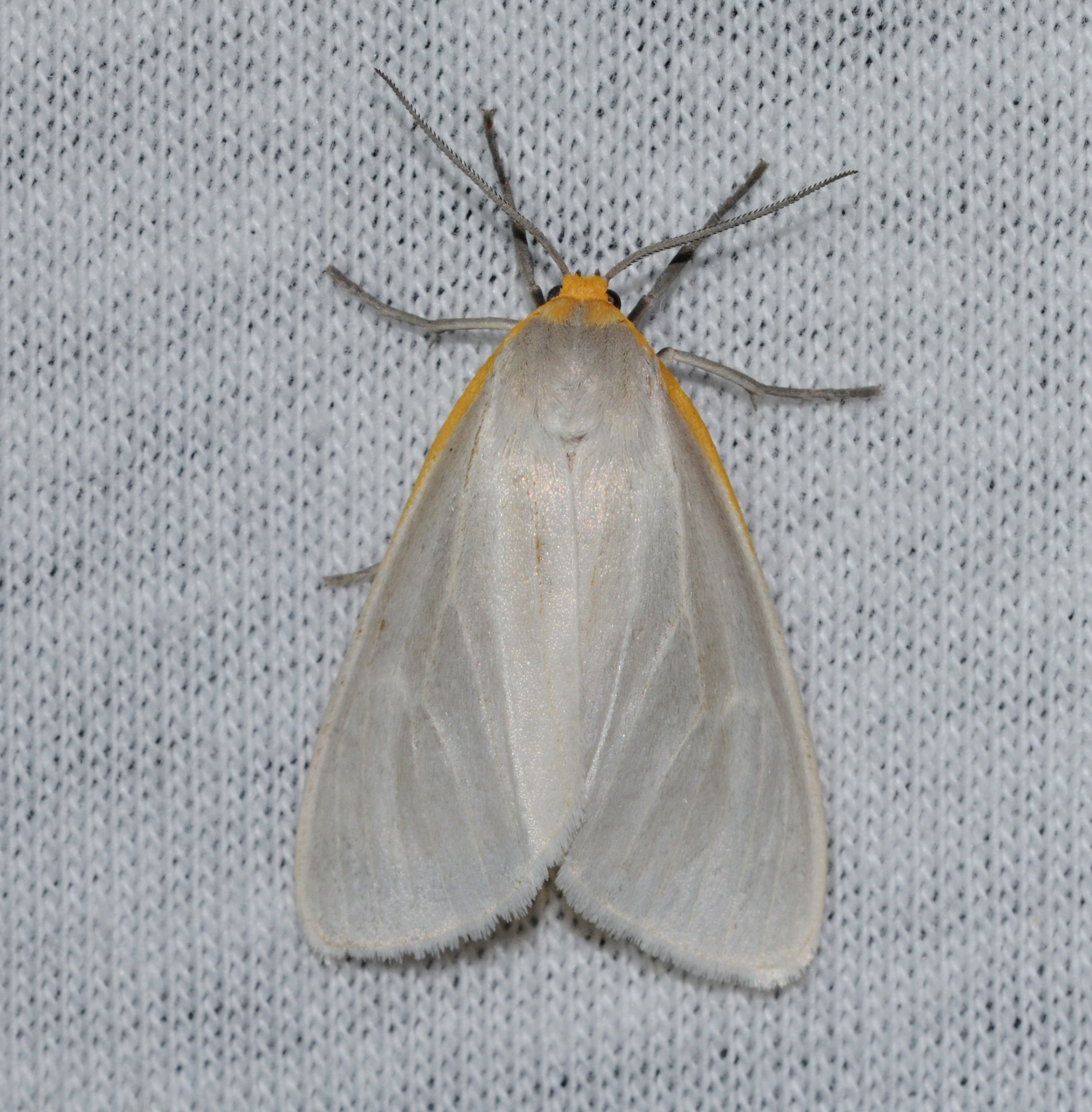
- Adult
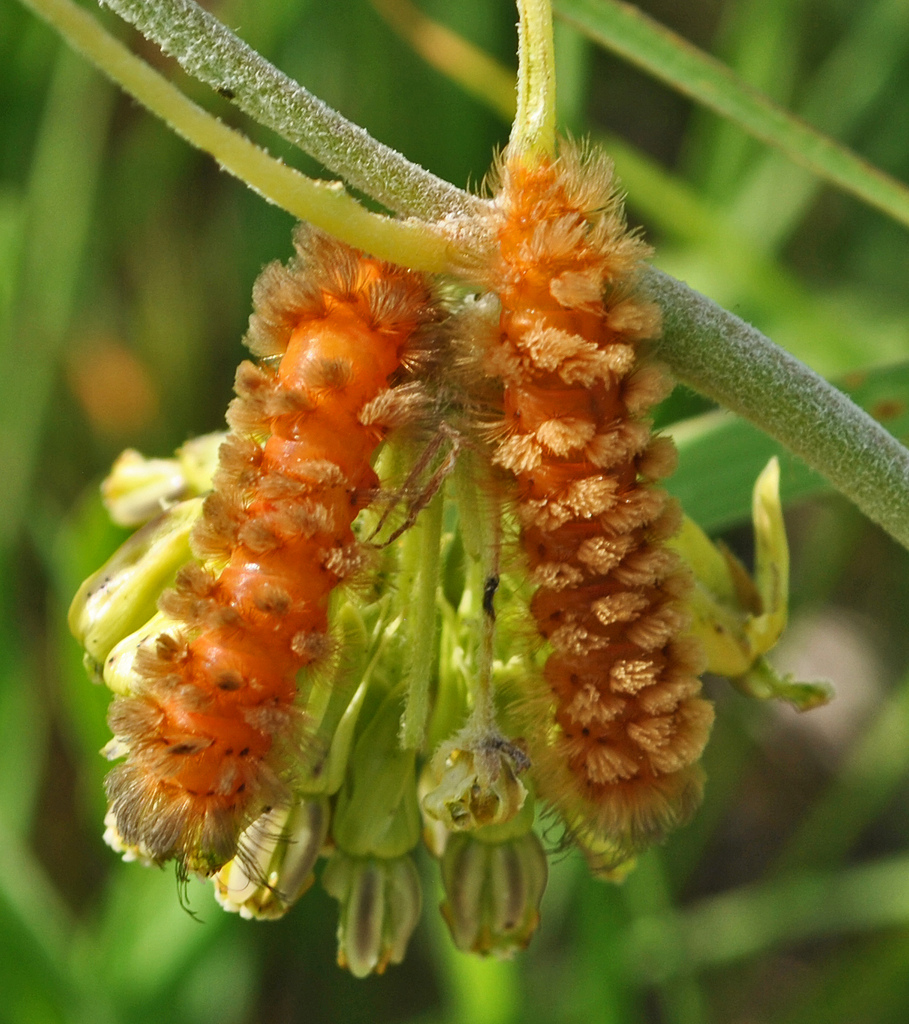
- Caterpillars feeding on Asclepias viridiflora

Scientific classification
- Domain: Eukaryota
- Kingdom: Animalia
- Phylum: Arthropoda
- Class: Insecta
- Order: Lepidoptera
- Superfamily: Noctuoidea
- Family: Erebidae
- Subfamily: Arctiinae
- Genus: Cycnia
- Species: C. inopinatus

Binomial name
- Cycnia inopinatus (H. Edwards, 1882)

Synonyms
- Euchaetes inopinatus H. Edwards, 1882; Euchaetes nivalis Stretch, 1906; Ammalo tenerosa Dyar, 1913

= Cycnia inopinatus =

Unexpected cycnia

Species of moth

Cycnia inopinatus, the unexpected cycnia, is a moth of the family Erebidae. It was described by Henry Edwards in 1882. It is found in the United States (Florida, Arkansas, Georgia, Illinois, Indiana, Iowa, Kansas, Kentucky, Maryland, Massachusetts, Michigan, Minnesota, Mississippi, Missouri, Nebraska, New Jersey, New Mexico, New York, Ohio, Oklahoma, Pennsylvania, Rhode Island, South Carolina, Tennessee, Texas, Virginia, Wisconsin) and Mexico. The habitat consists of high quality barrens remnants.

The wingspan is about 27 mm. Adults have been recorded on wing from April to August.

The larvae feed on Asclepias species.

== Etymology ==
The species name is derived from Latin inopinatus (meaning unexpected, surprising).

== Subspecies ==
- Cycnia inopinatus inopinatus
- Cycnia inopinatus tenerosa (Dyar, 1913) (Mexico)
