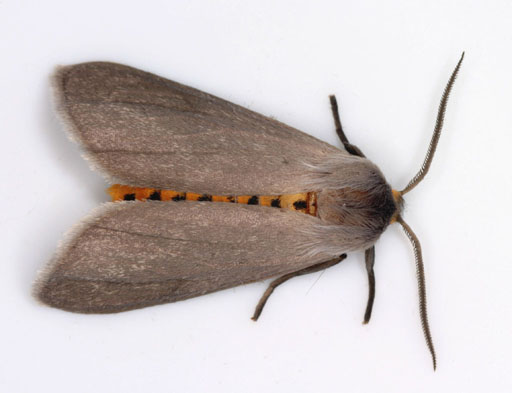

Scientific classification
- Kingdom: Animalia
- Phylum: Arthropoda
- Class: Insecta
- Order: Lepidoptera
- Superfamily: Noctuoidea
- Family: Erebidae
- Subfamily: Arctiinae
- Genus: Euchaetes
- Species: E. egle

Binomial name
- Euchaetes egle (Drury, 1773)

Synonyms
- Phalaena egle Drury, 1773; Euchaetes egle f. cyclica H. Edwards, 1883

= Euchaetes egle =

Milkweed tiger moth

Species of moth

Euchaetes egle, the milkweed tiger moth or milkweed tussock moth, is a moth in the family Erebidae and the tribe Arctiini, the tiger moths. The species was first described by Dru Drury in 1773. It is a common mid- through late summer feeder on milkweeds and dogbane. Like most species in this family, it has chemical defenses it acquires from its host plants, in this case, cardiac glycosides. These are retained in adults and deter bats, and presumably other predators, from feeding on them. Only very high cardiac glycoside concentrations deterred bats as predators. Adults indicate their unpalatability to bats with ultrasonic clicks from their tymbal organs.

== Range ==
It is found from southern Canada and south through Texas and Florida in North America.

== Lifecycle ==
One generation per year occurs in the north, and two or more may occur in the south.

=== Egg ===
Females lay eggs in masses on the undersides of leaves.

=== Larva ===
Early instars appear slightly hairy and gray. They skeletonize whole leaves gregariously, leaving lacy leaf remnants. They are gregarious until their third instar. Later instars sport tufts of black, white and orange (sometimes yellow) setae (hairs). The head capsule is black. The later instars wander much more, and may appear alone or in groups of up to 10. Mature caterpillars occur from June onwards. Larvae grow as long as 35 mm.

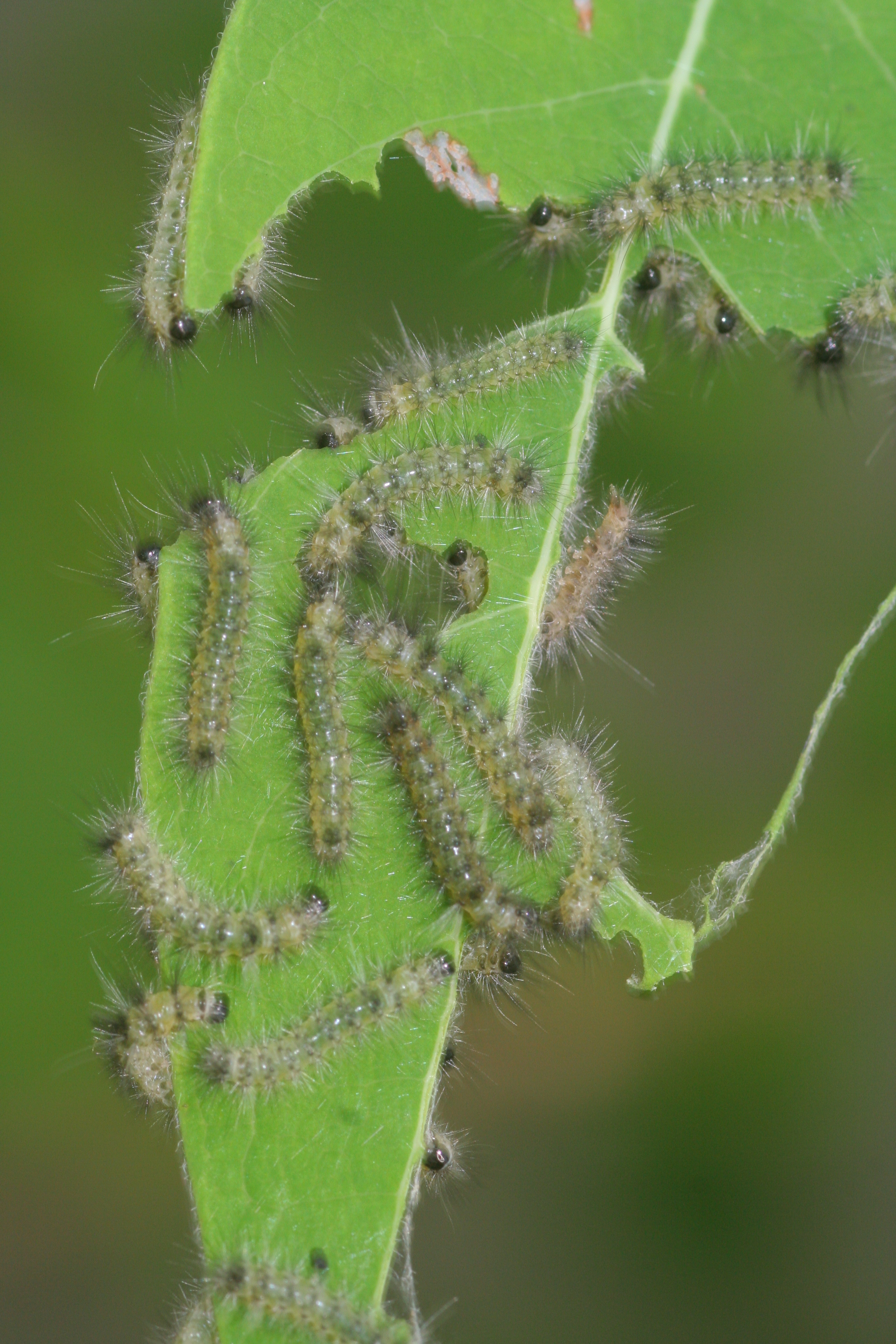
Early instar

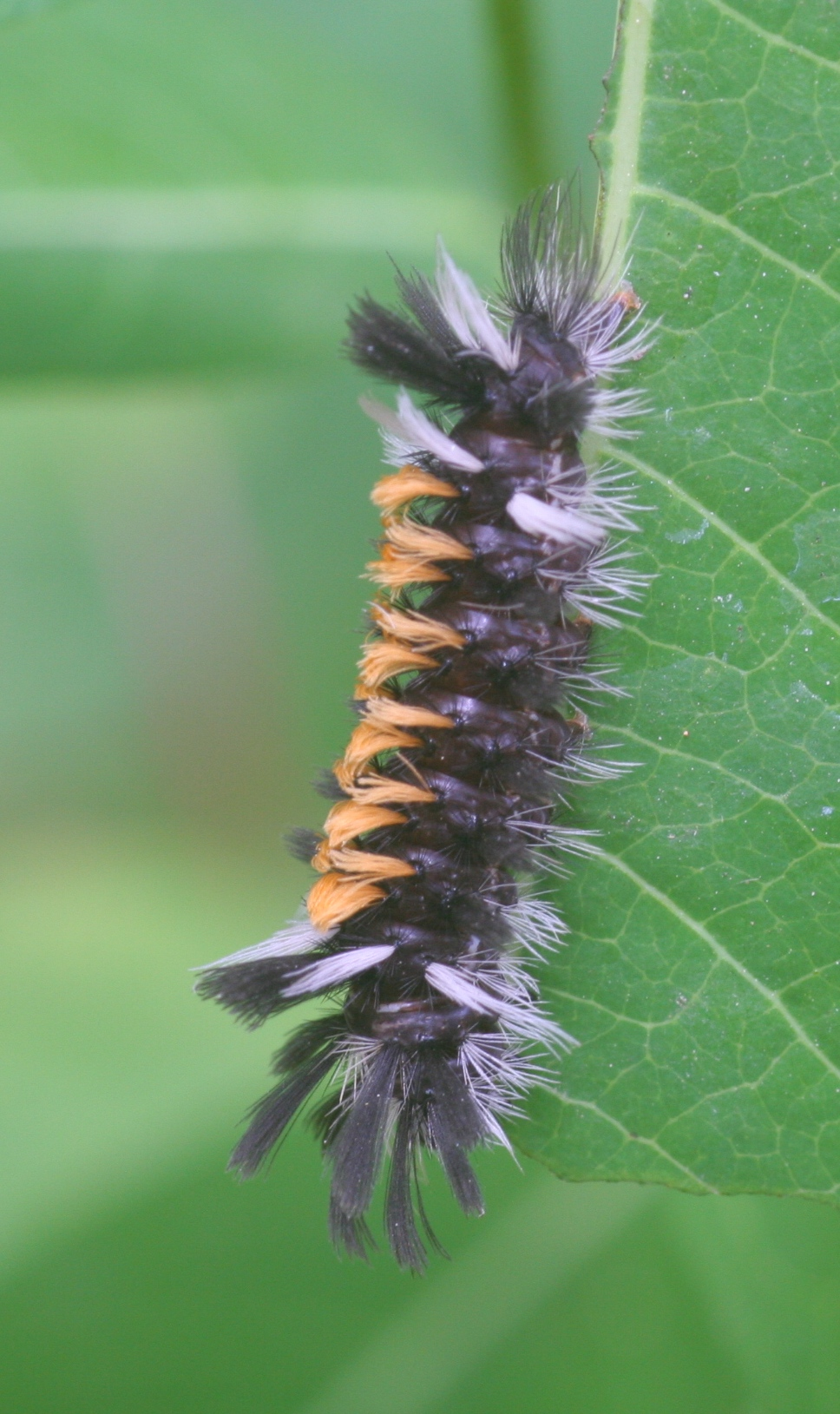
Late instar

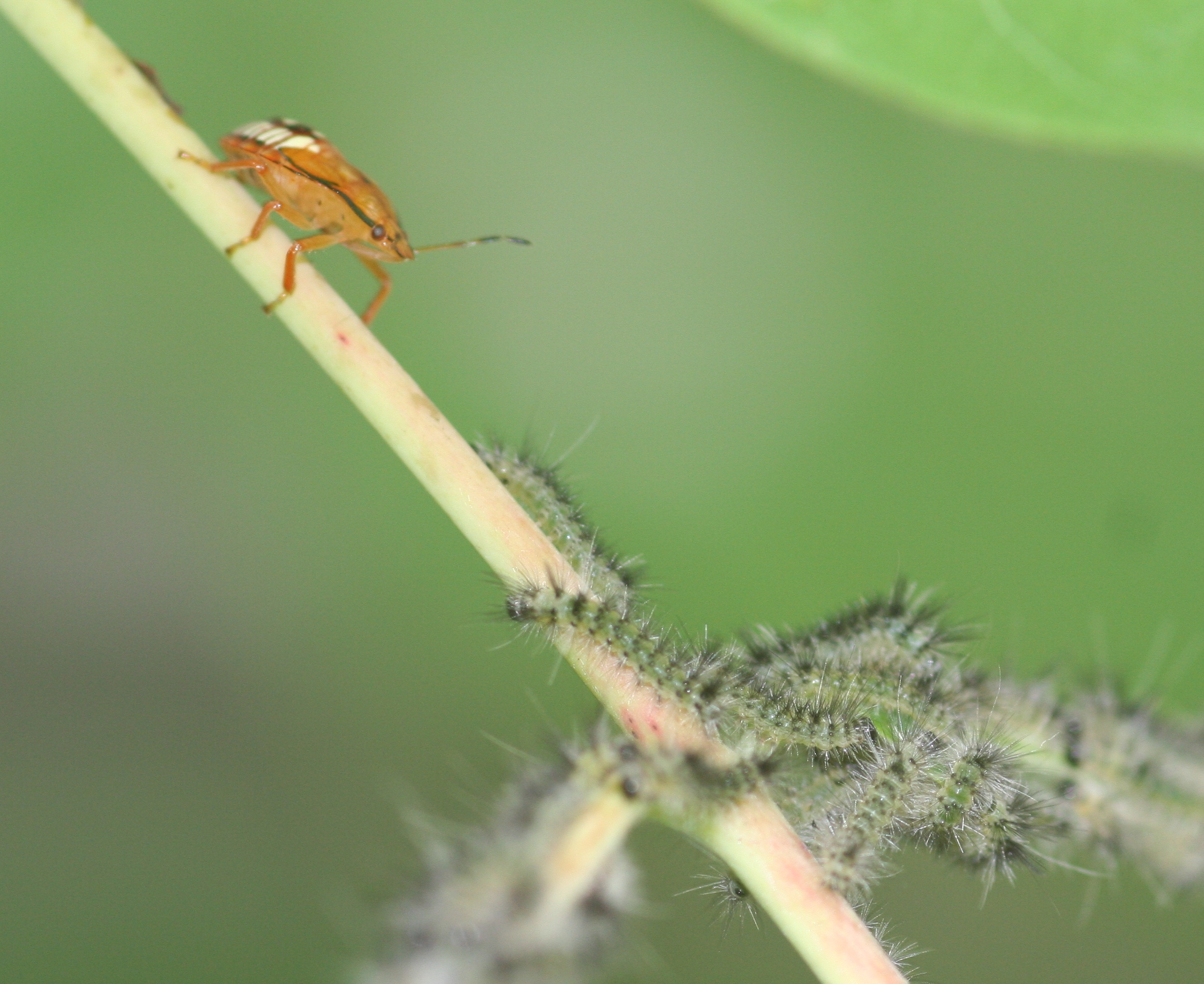
Under attack of a pentatomid

The milkweed tiger moth larvae (23 mm long) consuming common milkweed.

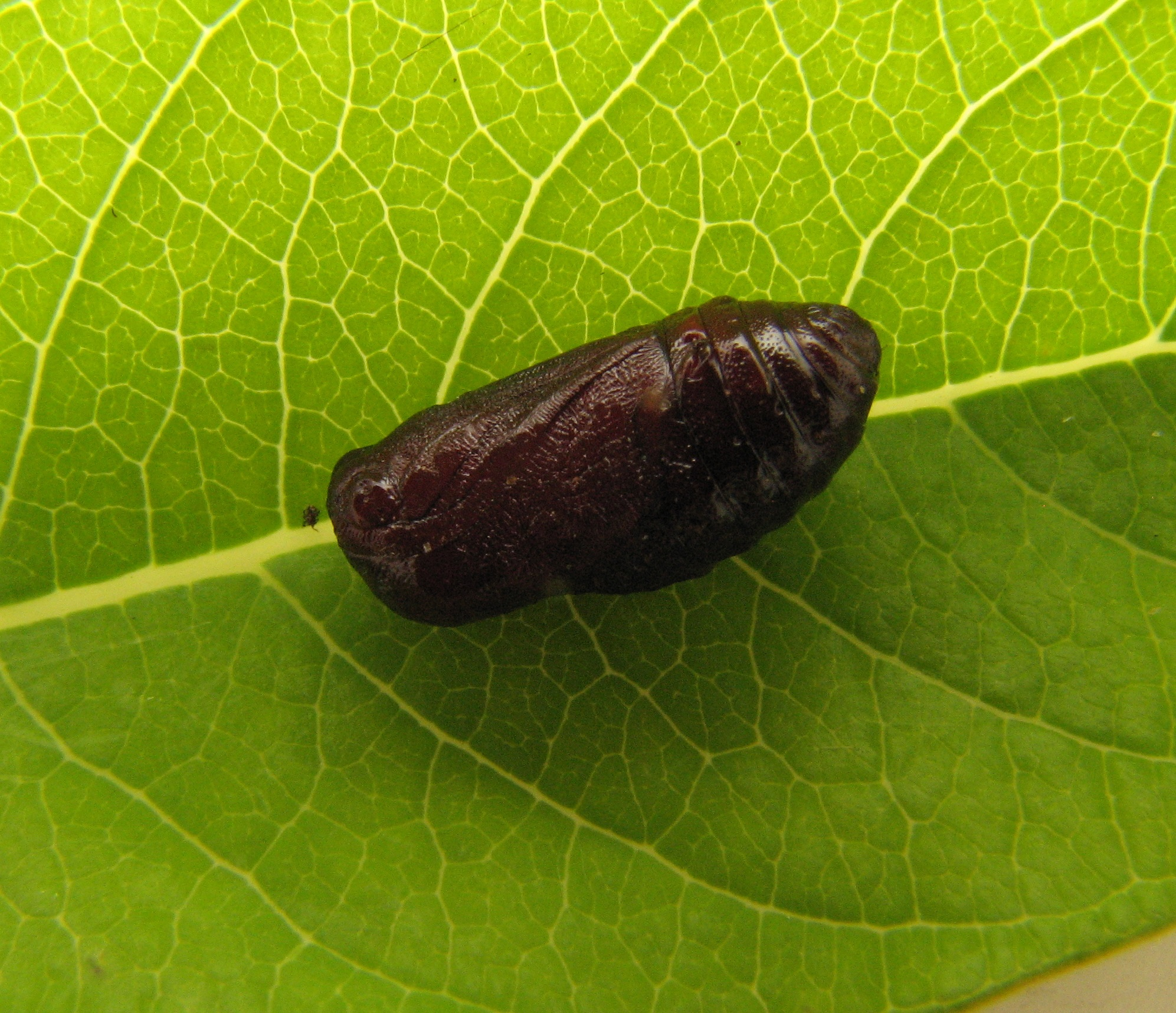
Pupa (cocoon removed)

=== Pupa ===
The gray cocoon is felted, with hairs from the larvae, and overwinters.

=== Adults ===
Wings are grayish. Abdomens are hairy and yellow, each with a row of black dots on its dorsum. Males use their tymbal organs in calling females and in defense against bats.

== Food plants ==
This moth frequently uses milkweeds (Asclepias spp.) and sometimes dogbane (Apocynum spp.) as larval host plants. Larvae often feed on older milkweed shoots, and seldom share shoots with monarchs (Danaus plexippus), which prefer younger ones.

Dogbanes and milkweeds produce a sticky latex that can impede larval feeding. Early instars avoid the veins by skeletonizing the leaves. Older larvae sever the veins that supply the latex, which reduces latex flow to the area on which they feed.
