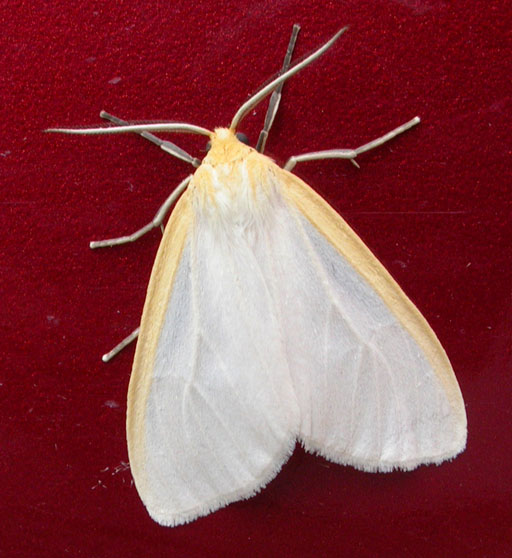

Conservation status
- Secure (NatureServe)

Scientific classification
- Kingdom: Animalia
- Phylum: Arthropoda
- Clade: Pancrustacea
- Class: Insecta
- Order: Lepidoptera
- Superfamily: Noctuoidea
- Family: Erebidae
- Subfamily: Arctiinae
- Genus: Cycnia
- Species: C. tenera

Binomial name
- Cycnia tenera (Hübner, 1818)

Synonyms
- Hypercombe ternera Hubner, 1808; Tanada antica Walker, 1856; Arctia sciurus Boisduval, 1869; Euchaetes yosemitae H. Edwards, 1883

= Cycnia tenera =

Dogbane tiger moth

Species of moth

Cycnia tenera, the dogbane tiger moth or delicate cycnia, is a moth in the family Erebidae. It occurs throughout North America, from southern British Columbia to Nova Scotia southwards to Arizona and Florida. The species is distasteful and there is evidence that it emits aposematic ultrasound signals; these may also jam bat echolocation, as the functions are not mutually exclusive.

== Ecology ==
It is a common feeder on Apocynum cannabinum (dogbane, Indian hemp) which produces a milky latex containing cardenolides, toxic cardiac glycoside that defend against herbivores. It also feeds on milkweed species, Asclepias, at least in parts of its range, but is most commonly reported from dogbane. Its interactions with bats have been much studied, but are an area of dispute regarding whether the clicks emitted by adult moths are disruptive of bat echolocation, or merely aposematic warning signals. The two functions are not mutually exclusive, however, so it may not be possible to resolve the issue. The moth's coloration appears to be aposematic for insectivorous birds. Chemical signals do not prevent bats from attacking, but do cause bats to release C. tenera they have caught.

== Life cycle ==
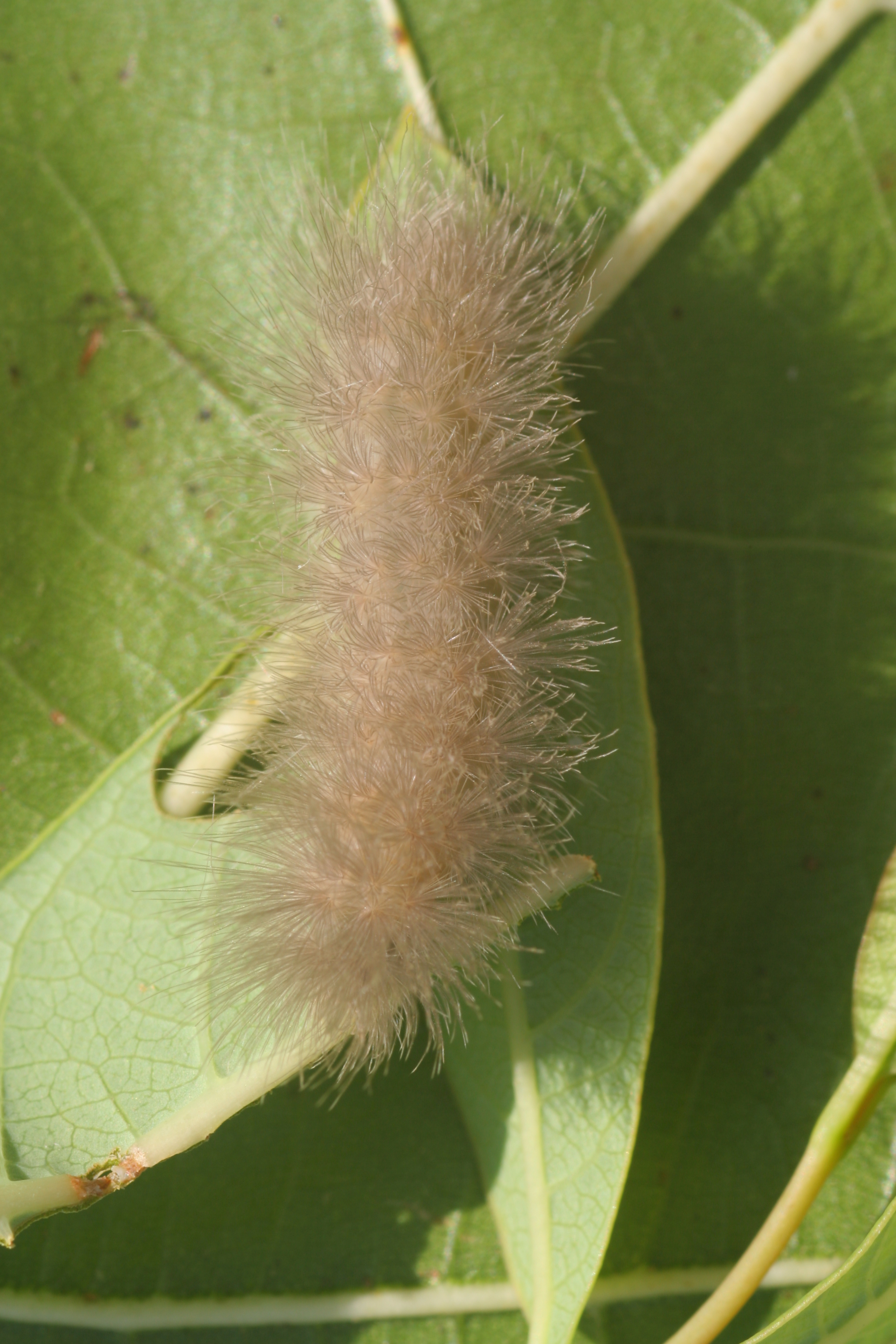
Dogbane tiger moth larva

This moth has several generations per year through much of its range, so caterpillars may be found from June to November.

Eggs are laid in clutches of 50–100. Larvae are reported to feed in aggregations of five to seven, at least in the early instars. Caterpillars are covered all over in soft grey to whitish hairs. Larvae feed at night.

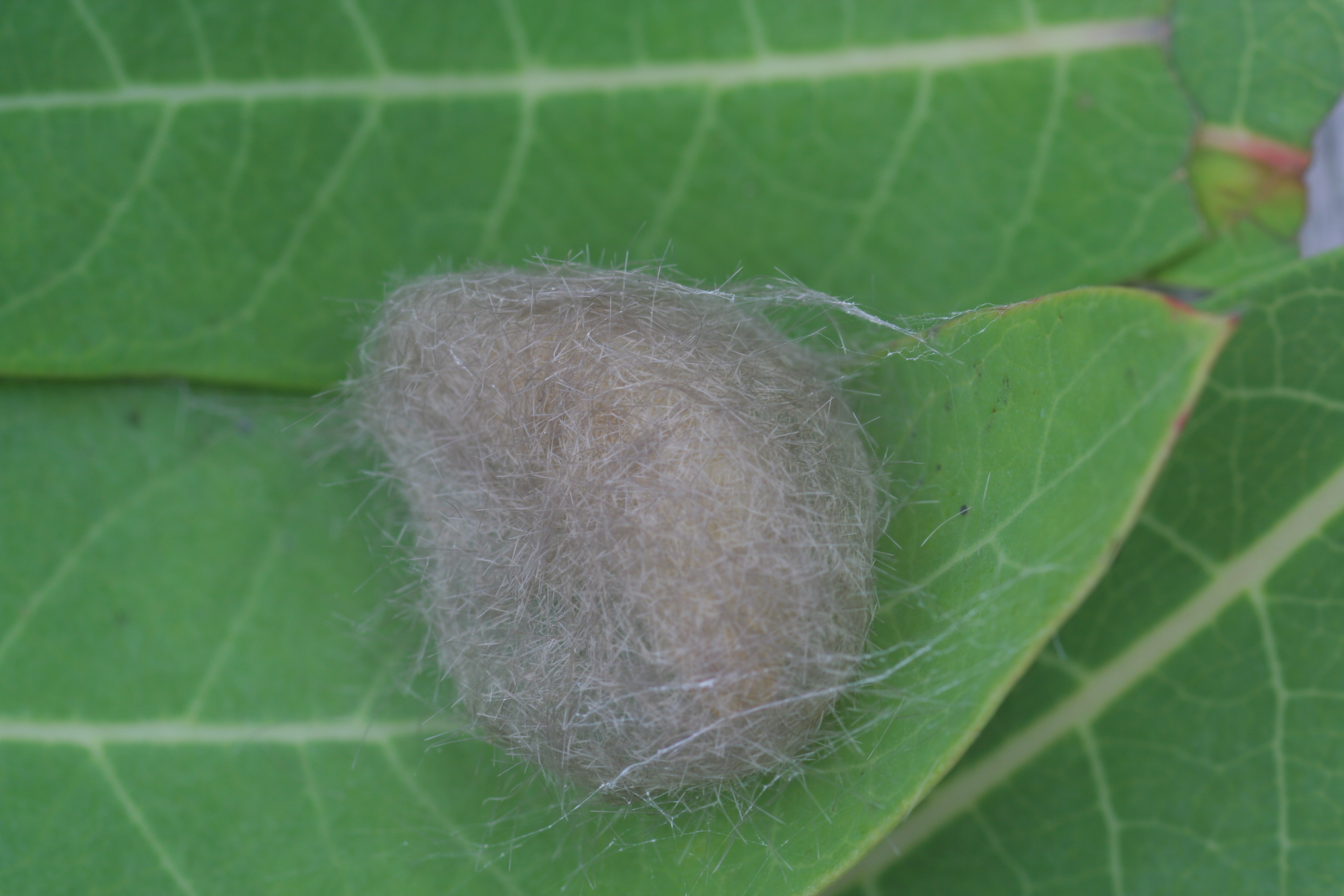
Dogbane tiger moth cocoon

The cocoon is grayish and covered in hairs from the caterpillar's body.

Adults have white wings with a buttery yellow margin along the front of the forewing; the legs are black. The underside of the forewing may have a dusting of black. The body is yellow with a row of black spots. The wingspan is 30–40 millimetres (1.2–1.6 in).

== Ultrasound calls ==
Bats refuse to eat either muted or intact moths of C. tenera. Hawking bats, that is, those seeking moths in flight, attacked intact, clicking C. tenera less frequently than surgically muted (with tymbal organs destroyed) moths in experiments. Intact moths emitted calls when the hunting bats switched from search phase calls to approach phase calls. In gleaning attacks, when bats attack moths perched on surfaces, bats use a different frequency of sound that these moths cannot hear, and the moths do not respond until actually handled by bats. Then clicking moths were dropped more frequently than mute moths.

In a set of experiments using bats that had never been exposed to moths before, Hristov and Conner found the clicking signals helped the bats to learn which moths are distasteful, and so to avoid them. They did not rule out a jamming function for the calls, however, and Ratcliffe and Fullard noted 20% of these native bats aborted attacks on the moth.

The calls are additionally used by male moths to signal to female moths. Like many Arctiinae, C. tenera flies all day and night, though preferentially some time after dusk. Its sense of hearing, on the other hand, is only moderately well-developed. Thus, the calls of Cycnia tenera have more of a defensive than a social function, and the aposematic role is likely to be significant.

== Subspecies ==
- Cycnia tenera tenera
- Cycnia tenera sciurus (Boisduval, 1869)
