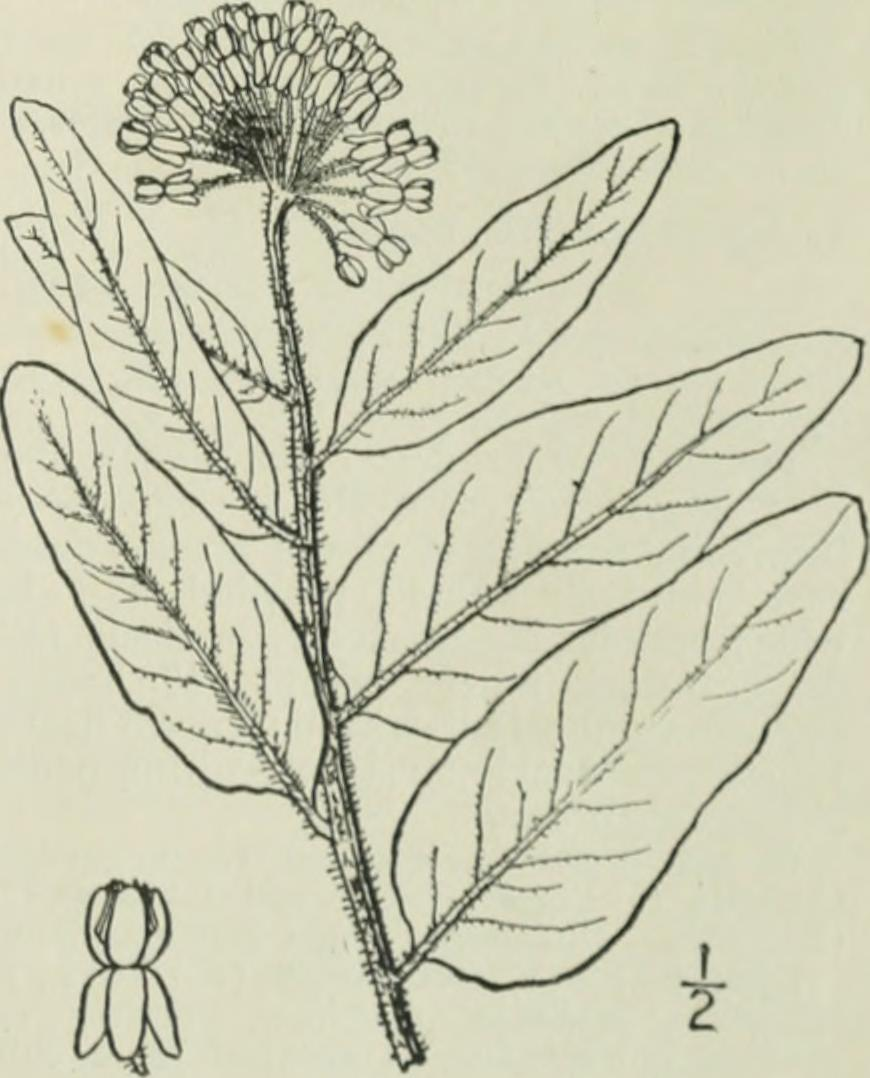
- Illustration of Asclepias lanuginosa

Scientific classification
- Kingdom: Plantae
- Clade: Tracheophytes
- Clade: Angiosperms
- Clade: Eudicots
- Clade: Asterids
- Order: Gentianales
- Family: Apocynaceae
- Genus: Asclepias
- Species: A. lanuginosa

Binomial name
- Asclepias lanuginosa Nutt.

Synonyms
- Acerates lanuginosa (Nutt.) Decne.; Asclepias nuttalliana Torr.; Polyotus lanuginosus (Nutt.) Nutt.

= Asclepias lanuginosa =

Species of plant

Asclepias lanuginosa, the woolly milkweed or sidecluster milkweed, is a species of flowering plant in the dogbane family, Apocynaceae, native to central Canada and the upper Midwest United States. It was described in 1818. It is a perennial herb that grows 6–12 inches (15–30 cm) tall.
