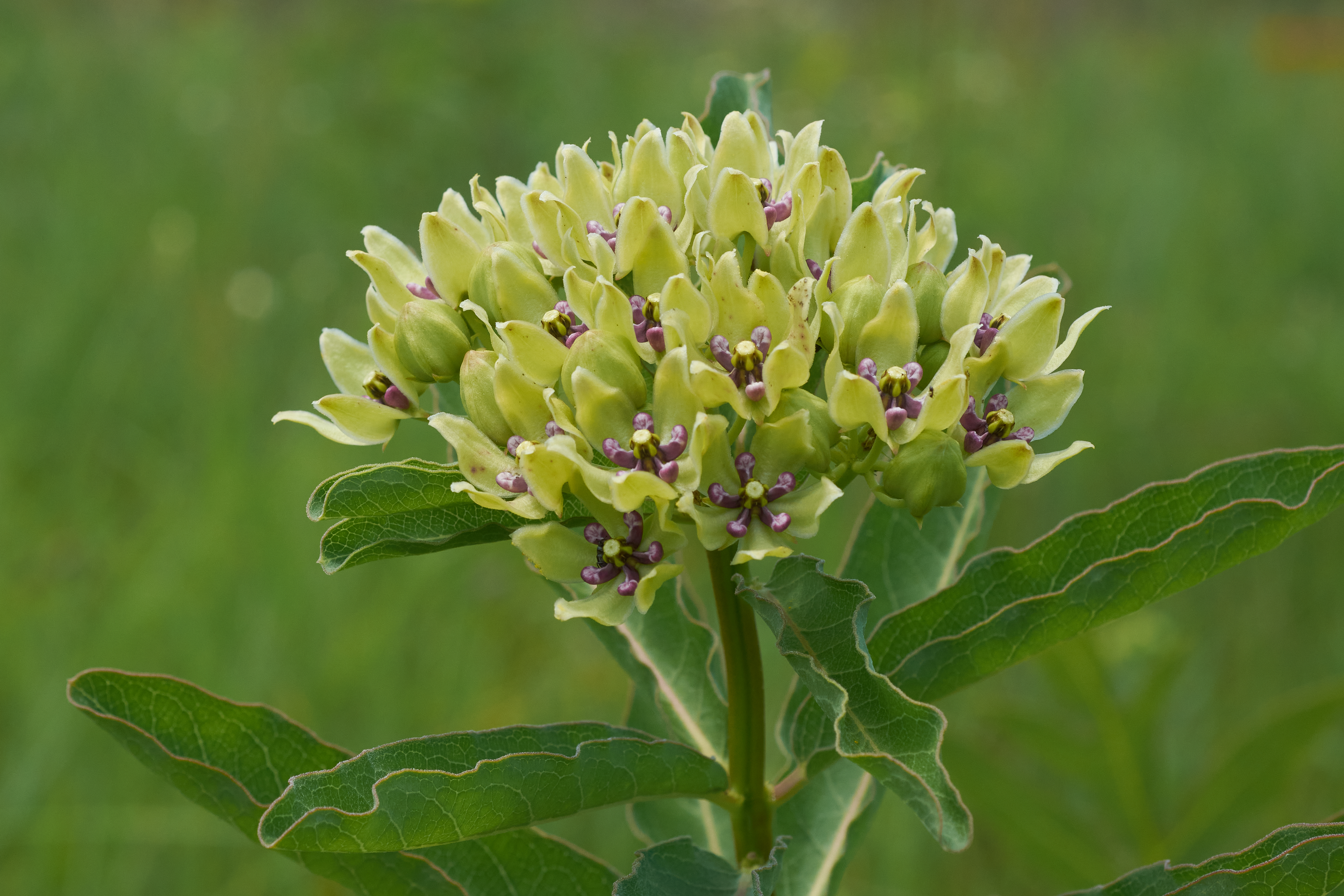

Conservation status
- Apparently Secure (NatureServe)

Scientific classification
- Kingdom: Plantae
- Clade: Tracheophytes
- Clade: Angiosperms
- Clade: Eudicots
- Clade: Asterids
- Order: Gentianales
- Family: Apocynaceae
- Genus: Asclepias
- Species: A. viridis

Binomial name
- Asclepias viridis Walter

= Asclepias viridis =

Species of plant

Asclepias viridis is a species of milkweed, a plant in the dogbane family known by the common names green milkweed, green antelopehorn and spider milkweed. The Latin word viridis means green. The plant is native to the midwestern, south central and southeastern United States, as well as to the southeastern portion of the western United States.

A. viridis is a perennial forb with alternately arranged leaves. The inflorescence is an umbel of white flowers with purplish centers. Its root system is a taproot, like that of butterfly weed (A. tuberosa).

A. viridis grows on many types of soil. It is common in overgrazed pasture land and roadsides.

== Ecology ==
Like some other milkweed species, A. viridis is a host plant for the monarch butterfly (Danaus plexippus). It is one of the most important host plants in the southern United States for the generation of monarch butterflies that develop from eggs that monarchs have laid after spending the winter in Mexico.

Monarch Watch provides information on rearing monarchs and their host plants. Efforts to restore falling monarch butterfly populations by establishing butterfly gardens and monarch migratory "waystations" require particular attention to the target species' food preferences and population cycles, as well to the conditions needed to propagate and maintain their food plants.

For example, where it grows in the southern Great Plains and in the western United States, monarchs reproduce on A. viridis, especially when its foliage is soft and fresh. Because monarch reproduction peaks in those areas in late summer and early fall when scenescent milkweed foliage is old and tough, A. viridis needs to be mowed or cut back in July to assure that it will be regrowing rapidly when monarch reproduction reaches its peak.

A. viridis is one of the first milkweeds to bloom in the Ohio River Valley (May to June). In that area, monarch butterfly and milkweed tussock moth (Euchaetes egle) caterpillars are seldom found on the plant as it sheds its leaves and becomes dormant in late June to early July before the two Lepidoptera species arrive. However, in Texas, A. viridis is dormant by July and then re-sprouts in the fall during some years, while in other years, it stays green all summer and blooms a second or third time.

== Cultivation ==
The plant is difficult to cultivate and does not grow well in containers. The seeds of some milkweeds need periods of cold treatment (cold stratification) before they will germinate. To protect seeds from washing away during heavy rains and from seed–eating birds, one can cover the seeds with a light fabric or with an 0.5 in (13 mm) layer of straw mulch. However, mulch acts as an insulator. Thicker layers of mulch can prevent seeds from germinating if they prevent soil temperatures from rising enough when winter ends. Further, few seedlings can push through a thick layer of mulch.
