= Butterfly gardening =

Gardening to benefit butterflies

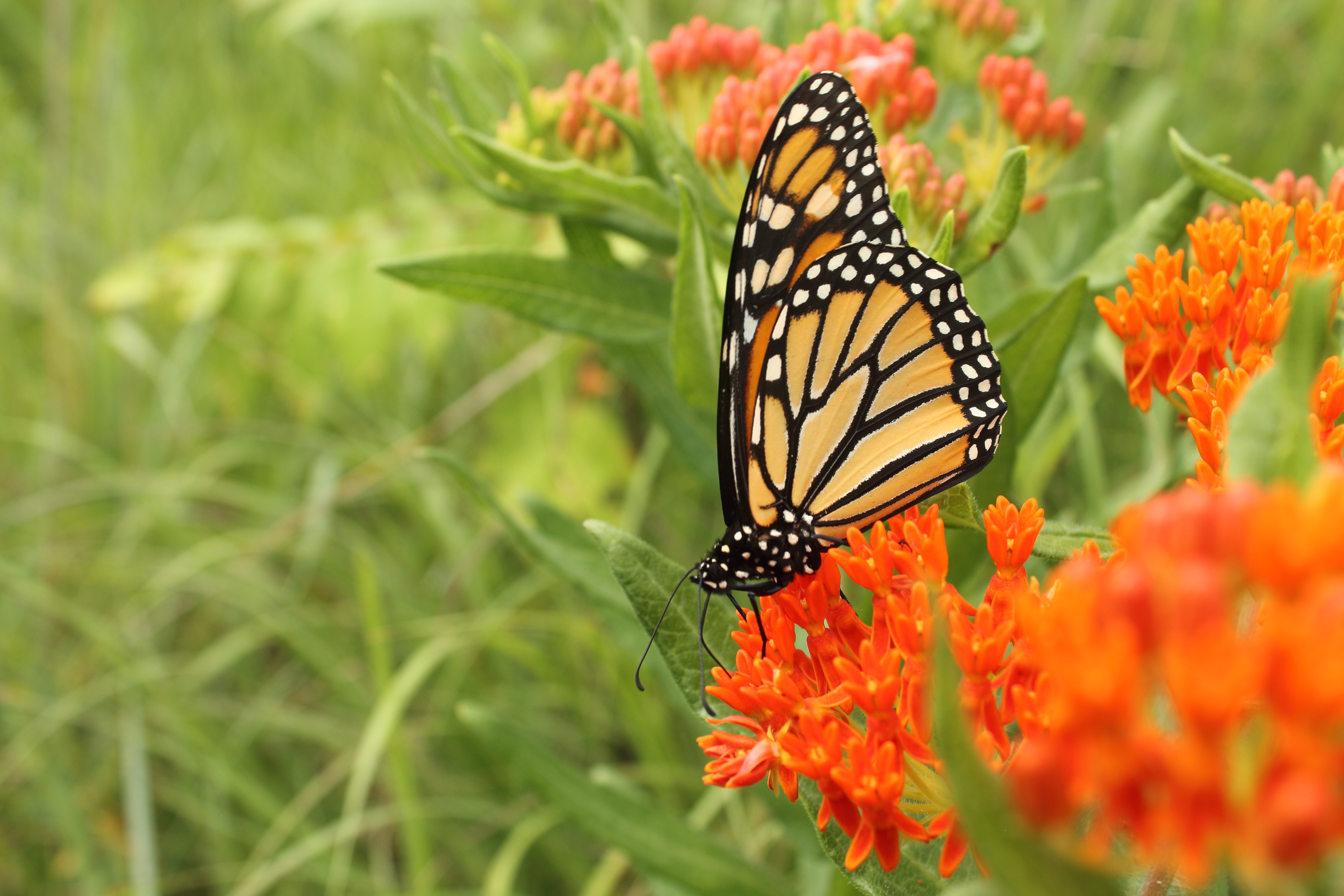
A monarch butterfly (Danaus plexippus) feeding on butterfly weed (Asclepias tuberosa). Monarch populations have been declining in abundance due to loss of habitat in the United States and deforestation at overwintering grounds in Mexico.

Butterfly gardening is a way to create, improve, and maintain habitat for lepidopterans including butterflies, skippers, and moths. Butterflies have four distinct life stages—egg, larva, chrysalis, and adult. In order to support and sustain butterfly populations, an ideal butterfly garden contains habitat for each life stage.

Butterfly larvae, with some exceptions such as the carnivorous harvester (Feniseca tarquinius), consume plant matter and can be generalists or specialists. While butterflies like the painted lady (Vanessa cardui) are known to consume over 200 plants as caterpillars, other species like the monarch (Danaus plexippus), and the regal fritillary (Speyeria idalia) only consume plants in one genus, milkweed and violets, respectively.

As adults, butterflies feed mainly on nectar, but they have also evolved to consume rotting fruit, tree sap, and even carrion. Supporting nectarivorous adult butterflies involves planting nectar plants of different heights, color, and bloom times. Butterfly bait stations can easily be made to provide a food source for species that prefer fruit and sap. In addition to food sources, windbreaks in the form of trees and shrubs shelter butterflies and can provide larval food and overwintering grounds. "Puddling" is a behavior generally done by male butterflies in which they gather to drink nutrients and water and incorporating a puddling ground for butterflies will enhance a butterfly garden. While butterflies are not the only pollinators, creating butterfly habitat also creates habitat for bees, beetles, flies, and other pollinators.

== Reasoning ==
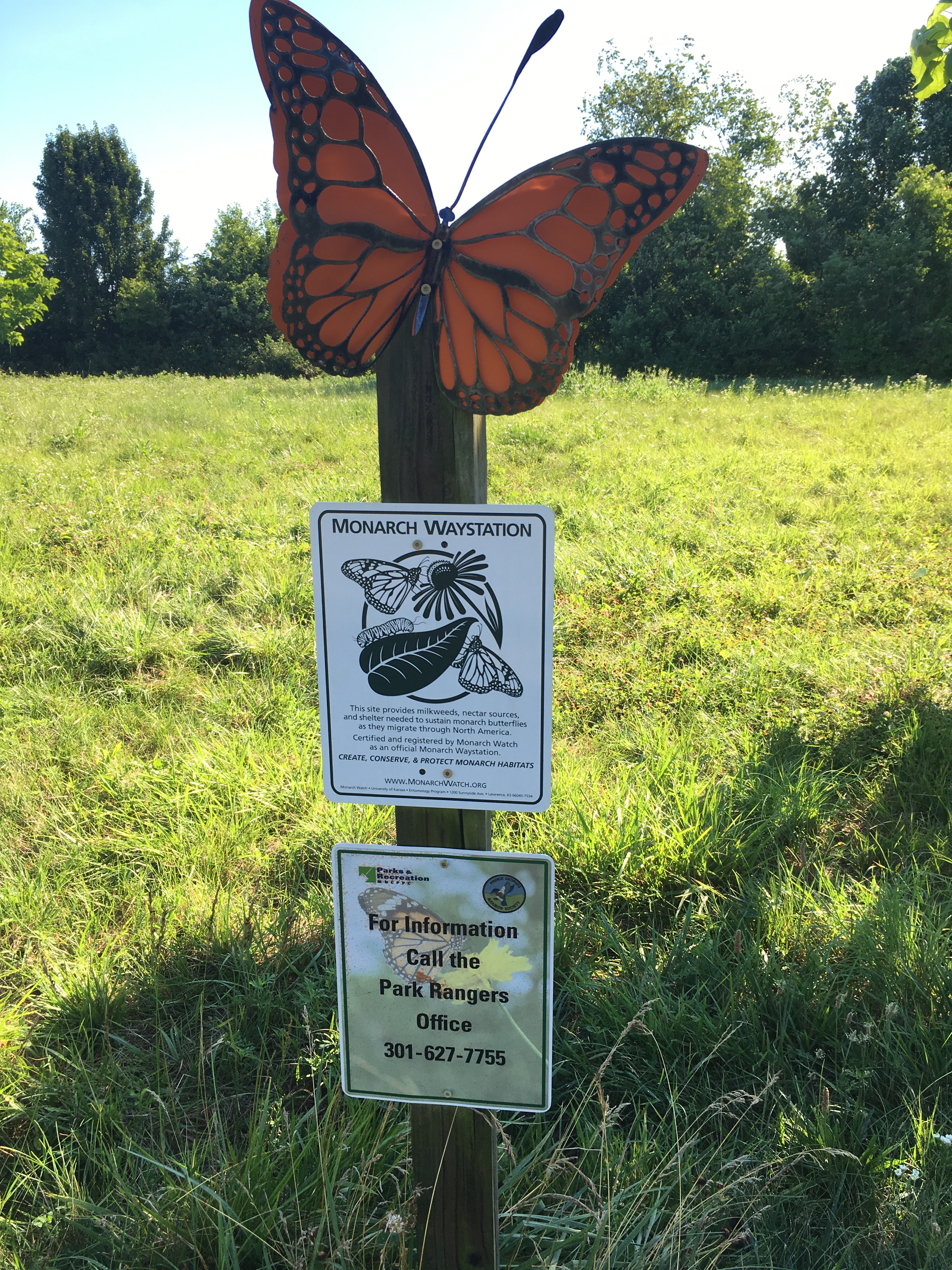
A monarch waystation near the town of Berwyn Heights in Prince George's County, Maryland (June 2017)

Butterfly gardening provides a recreational activity to view butterflies interacting with the environment. Besides anthropocentric values of butterfly gardening, creating habitat reduces the impacts of habitat fragmentation and degradation. Habitat degradation is a multivariate issue; development, increased use of pesticides and herbicides, woody encroachment, and non-native plants are contributing factors to the decline in butterfly and pollinator habitat. Pollination is one ecological service butterflies provide; about 90% of flowering plants and 35% of crops rely on animal pollination. Butterfly gardens and monarch waystations, even in developed urban areas, provide habitat that increases the diversity of butterflies and other pollinators, including bees, flies, and beetles.

== Ground-truthing ==
Before buying plants and digging into the soil, "ground-truthing" is a necessary first step, Ground-truthing involves surveying a property in order to assess the current resources available. Some aspects to keep in mind are the following:

- south-facing slopes
- natural wind breaks
- present plant species
- present butterfly species

Butterflies are ectothermic and rely on solar radiation for their metabolism. South-facing slopes are an ideal location for a butterfly garden, as they provide the most solar radiation (in the Northern Hemisphere; the opposite is true in the Southern Hemisphere). Where native, shrubs and trees such as spicebush (Lindera benzoin), pawpaw (Asimina triloba), sassafras (Sassafras albidum), and black cherry (Prunus serotina), provide windbreaks for butterflies and can also be their host plants.

== Plants ==
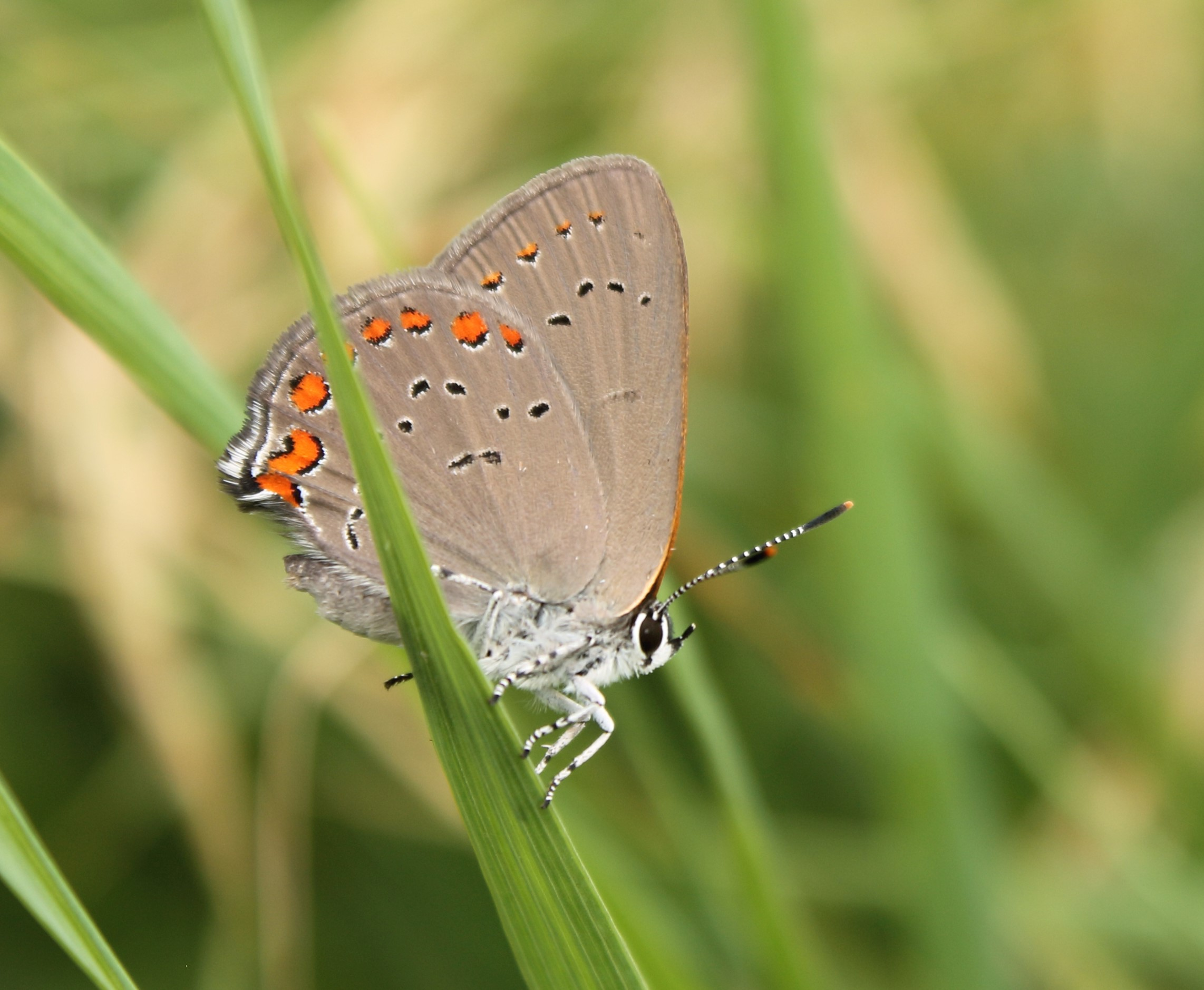
A coral hairstreak (Satyrium titus) resting on a clump of grass. The larvae will feed upon species in the family Rosaceae, including cherry (Prunus serotina)

The types of plants used in a butterfly garden will determine the species of butterflies that will visit the garden. Lepidoptera societies and the PLANTS database of the United States Department of Agriculture's (USDA's) Natural Resources Conservation Service provide state and county-level distribution maps of plants that are native to the United States. The Plants of the World Online database of the Royal Botanic Gardens, Kew, contains information on the taxonomy, identification, distribution, traits, threat status, and uses of plants worldwide, as well as many images of those plants. Published lists of host plants for butterflies and other pollinators can help select the plant species desired in the garden.

While non-native plants can provide floral resources to a garden, they can also have an overall negative effect on butterflies and other pollinators. Therefore, it is often recommended to use native plants. It is also important to check invasive species lists to ensure that plants are not invasive in a given locality or region. The Invasive Plant Atlas of the United States and similar publications can help provide such information.

Depending on the hardiness zone, some butterfly-attracting plants include: buttonbush (Cephalanthus occidentalis), blue mist shrub (Caryopteris × clandonensis), purple coneflower (Echinacea purpurea), yellow coneflowers, marigolds, poppies, cosmos, mountain mints (Pycnanthemum), sunflowers (Helianthus), salvias, some lilies, goldenrods (Solidago), asters, Coreopsis, Mexican sunflower (Tithonia rotundifolia), daisies (Bellis), joe pye weed (Eutrochium), verbenas, lantanas, liatris, milkweed (Asclepias) (especially for the monarch butterfly, whose caterpillars feed solely on this plant), zinnias, pentas, porterweeds, and others. A USDA conservation planting guide for Maryland recommends that, for optimum wildlife and pollinator habitat in mesic sites, a seed mix containing 30 seeds for each square foot of planting area should have 17.0% Asclepias syriaca (common milkweed) by weight and 6.0% by seed. Another such USDA guide for Maryland states that for herbaceous plantings, non-competitive bunch grasses (e.g., broomsedge (Andropogon virginicus), little bluestem (Schizachyrium scoparium), purpletop (Tridens flavus)) may be included in a seed mix for native plants at a low rate — less than 25% of the mix based on pure live seed per square foot (0.9 square meters).

The eastern monarch migration largely depends upon only three milkweed species: Asclepias syriaca (common milkweed), Asclepias viridis (green antelope horn milkweed), and Asclepias asperula (antelope horns milkweed). Butterfly gardens and monarch waystations in eastern and central North America should therefore feature one or more of those species, depending upon the areas in which the species are native.

Install flowering native trees and shrubs that also feed native butterfly caterpillars. For example, black cherry (Prunus serotina), a tree that is native to most of the eastern half of the United States, has white flowers that provide nectar to pollinators during the spring. P. serotina hosts the caterpillars of more than 450 species of butterflies and moths, including those of the eastern tiger swallowtail (Papilio glaucus), red-spotted purple/white admiral (Limenitis arthemis), viceroy (Limenitis archippus), and cherry gall azure (Celastrina serotina) butterflies and the cecropia (Hyalophora cecropia), promethea silkmoth (Callosamia promethea), polyphemus (Antheraea polyphemus), small-eyed sphinx (Paonias myops), wild cherry sphinx (Sphinx drupiferarum), banded tussock (Halysidota tessellaris), spotted apatelodes (Apatelodes torrefacta), and band-edged prominent moths.

Sassafras (Sassafras albidum), a tree that is native to the eastern half of the United States, has yellow, green, and brown flowers that provide nectar to pollinators during the spring. S. albidum hosts the caterpillars of 37 species of butterflies and moths, including the eastern tiger swallowtail, spicebush swallowtail (Papilio troilus), palamedes swallowtail (Papilio palamedes) and pale swallowtail (Papilio eurymedon) butterflies and the cecropia, promethea silkmoth, polyphemus, imperial (Eacles imperialis), and io (Automeris io) moths.

Spicebush (Lindera benzoin), a shrub that is native to the eastern half of the United States, has white, yellow, and green flowers that also provide nectar to pollinators during the spring. L. benzoin hosts the caterpillars of the spicebush swallowtail and eastern tiger swallowtail butterflies and the promethea silkmoth.

Avoid cultivars of plants unless they are more resistant to diseases than their native parents or that investigations have proven to be more beneficial to pollinators than their parents. Many cultivars are sterile and produce no nectar or pollen. As a result, their flowers do not benefit butterflies and other pollinators. Some have "double flowers". Their reproductive parts have been converted into extra petals and therefore do not produce floral rewards for pollinators. Some cultivars have reduced nutritional benefits, and have not been studied enough to identify those that may be harming pollinators.

Cultivars with features that significantly affect flower structure and/or color are those that are likely to alter their appeal to pollinators. Those selected for foliage color may be toxic to insects. Studies have shown that altering leaf color, and the chemical changes that this implies, reduces a plant's ability to serve as a resource for herbivorous insects.

Buddleja davidii, which is often called "butterfly-bush", attracts many butterflies. Although it originated in China, it is presently planted in many parts of the world in which it is non-native. In such settings, the plant feeds many native butterflies and other adult pollinators, but not many of their larvae. As B. davidii is invasive in some areas, plantings of the species are controversial. To prevent seeding and to promote further flowering, its blossoms need to be removed ("deadheaded") as soon as they are spent.

A number of Buddleja cultivars have become available that have a variety of sizes and blossom colors. University studies have suggested that nectaring butterflies have greater preferences for some of these than for others, with Lo & Behold 'Blue Chip' and 'Pink Delight' heading a list of eleven.

Some Buddleja cultivars are either sterile or produce less than 2% viable seed (see "Non-invasive" Buddleja cultivars). The state of Oregon, which designates B. davidii as a "noxious weed" and initially prohibited entry, transport, purchase, sale or propagation of all of its varieties, amended its quarantine in 2009 to permit those cultivars when approved or when proven to be interspecific hybrids. Monarch Watch recommends planting only male-sterile "Flutterby" cultivars.

It is important to avoid purchasing plants and seeds treated with insecticides such as neonicotinoids. Although not yet conclusive, there is increasing evidence that neonicotinoids can have negative effects on pollinating insects, including butterflies.

== Puddling ==
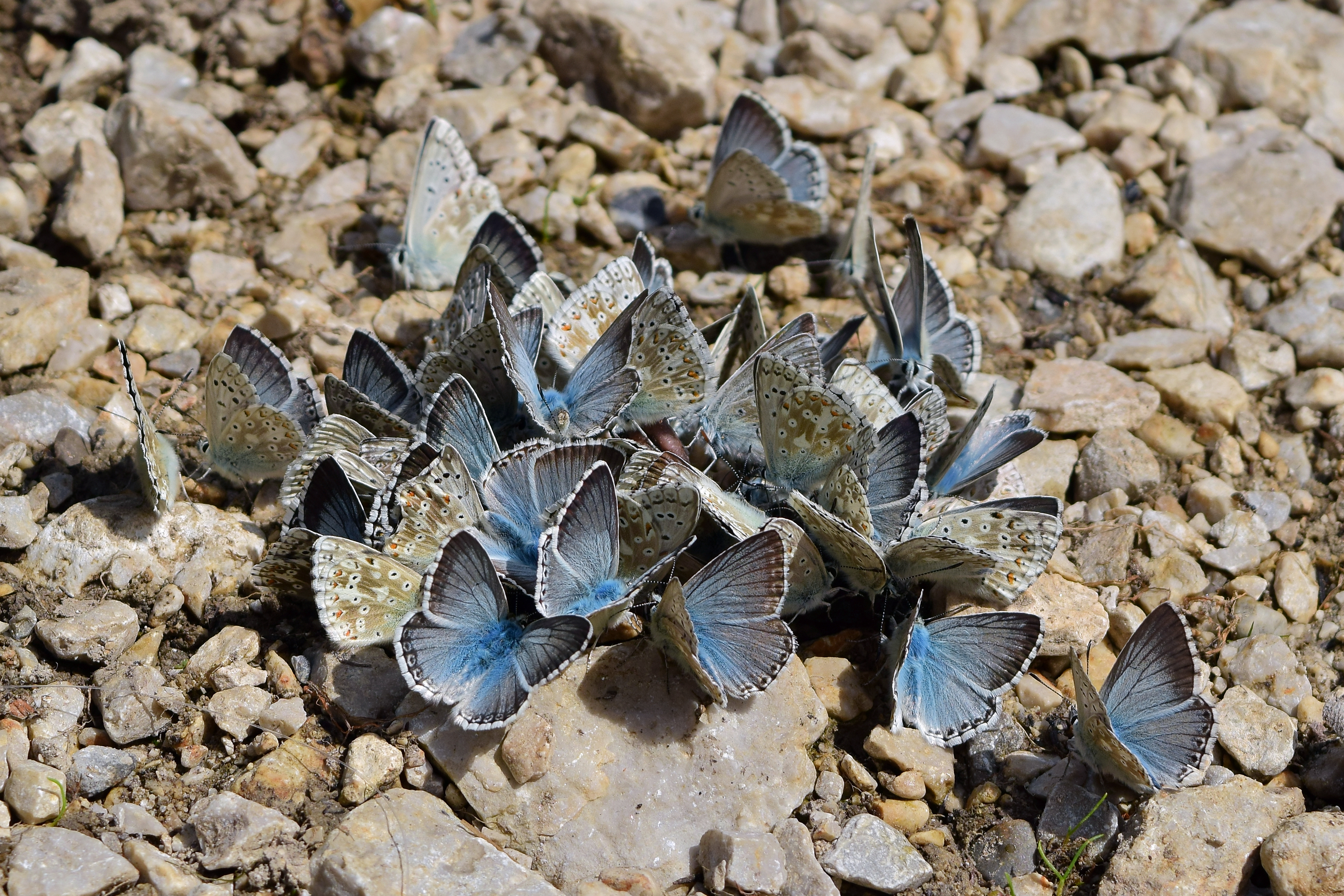
Group of Lysandra coridon puddling

"Puddling" refers to the behavior of male butterflies congregating on wet soil, dung, and carrion to feed on nutrients, specifically sodium. Nectar is low in sodium, and sodium is a limiting nutrient for Lepidoptera. Male butterflies are able to transfer sodium to females during copulation. The sodium is passed onto offspring and increases reproductive success. To create a simple puddling habitat, fill a shallow dish (like a draining tray for a pot) with wet sand. To increase the nutrients, mix compost with the sand. Add footholds for butterflies by adding different sized rocks.

== Baiting ==
There are numerous recipes for creating butterfly bait, but they have common ingredients. Fermentation is the key to a good bait, as it mimics the fermentation of rotting fruit and sap in the natural environment. Recipes include blending rotten fruit (i.e. bananas) with beer, maple syrup, molasses, or sugar. Often yeast is added as well to the mixture and left to ferment for a week. Urine is also known to attract fruit-feeding butterflies. The bait can be laid on stumps, rocks, and tree limbs.

== Problems ==
There are diseases that afflict butterflies, such as bacteria in the genus Pseudomonas, the nuclear polyhedrosis virus, and Ophryocystis elektroscirrha, which only infects queen butterflies and monarch butterflies.

In the absence of pesticides, aphids and true bugs may infest plants. Some gardeners release ladybugs (ladybirds) and other biological pest control agents that do not harm butterflies in order to control aphids. However, the release of ladybugs is not desirable in the United States and in many other locations, where the invasive Chinese ladybug (Harmonia axyridis) is often the species released. Perhaps more importantly, ladybugs and other predatory or parasitic insects can prey on butterfly and moth caterpillars and pupae even if they do not do so on adult Lepidoptera.

As an alternative, one can wait for local predatory insects to find the aphids. One can hasten this process if an infestation is high by spraying the plants with a mix of sugar and water, simulating aphid honeydew. This is known to attract lacewings whose larvae eat aphids.

One can also spray the plants with water, or rinse the plants with a mild detergent/water solution (although caterpillars should be relocated before suds are applied). Scented detergents are acceptable; those containing OxiClean should be avoided. The aphids will turn black within a day, and eventually fall off. Another technique is to plant a variety of different flowers, including ones that attract hoverflies and parasitic braconid wasps (Braconidae), whose larvae kill pest species. Further, some caterpillars such as those of the harvester butterfly (Feniseca tarquinius) feed on certain species of aphids, but not on plants.

Caterpillars can exhaust their source of food in small home gardens before metamorphosis occurs. Installing multiple plants can help reduce the chance of running out of leaves. If raising monarchs, one can replace the expended milkweed with a slice of pumpkin or cucumber, which can serve as a substitute source of food for monarch caterpillars in their final (fifth) instar.

Plantings of tropical milkweed/bloodflower (A. curassavica) are problematic. Where planted or naturalized in the southern United States, the non-native A. curassavica hosts monarch reproduction throughout the winter. This may alter the butterflies' migratory and breeding instincts, thus causing them to avoid migration and subsequent breeding and to increase their risk of infection.

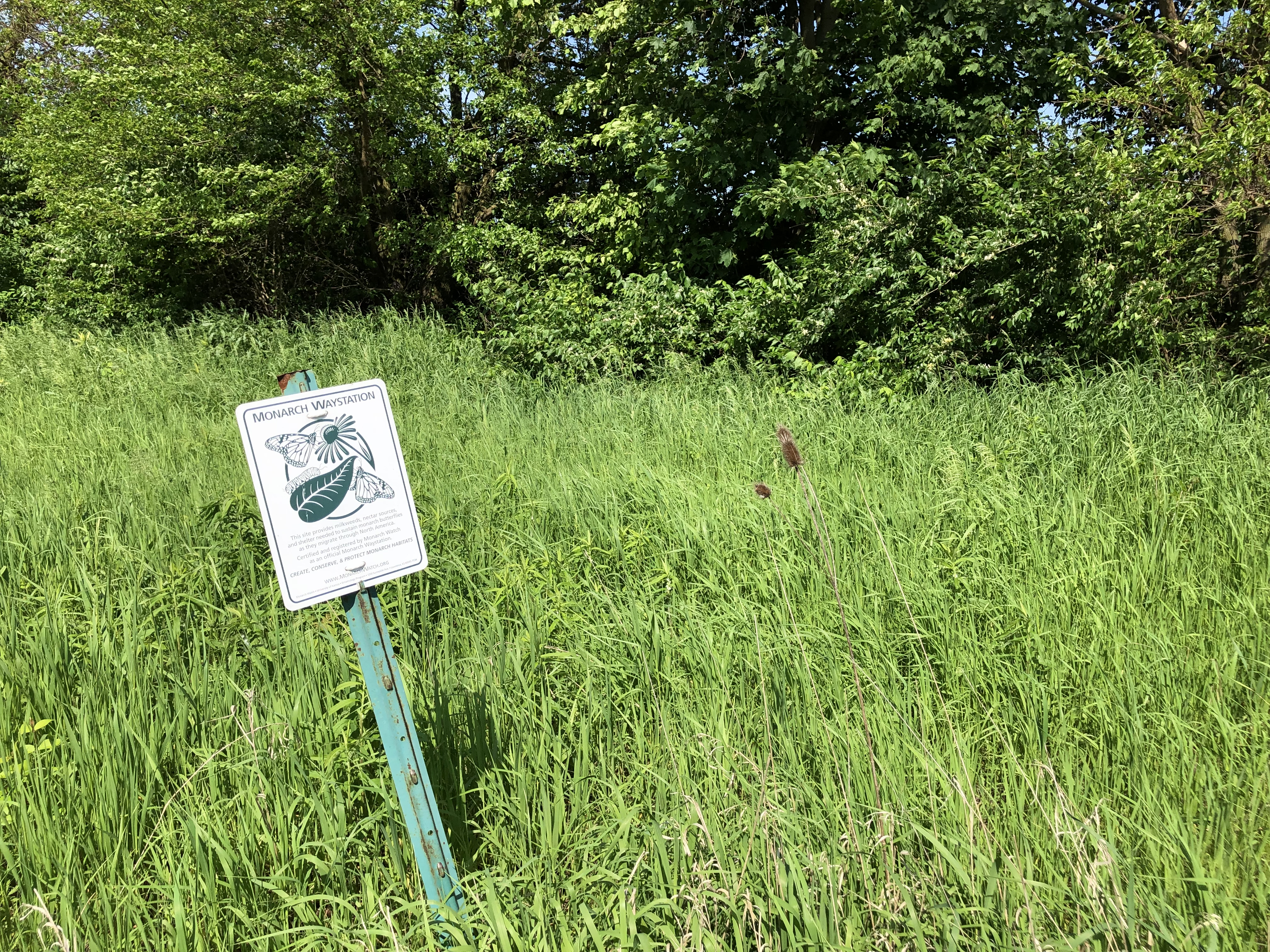
A monarch waystation in Bowling Green, Ohio, near Toledo (May 2019)

Monarch Watch provides information on rearing monarchs and their host plants. Efforts to restore falling butterfly populations by establishing butterfly gardens and migrating monarch "waystations" require particular attention to the target species' food preferences and population cycles, as well to the conditions needed to propagate and maintain their food plants.

Awareness of different milkweed species is of vital importance. For example, in the Washington, D.C., area and elsewhere in the northeastern and midwestern United States, common milkweed (Asclepias syriaca) is among the most important food plants for monarch caterpillars, especially when its foliage is soft and fresh. Within its range, it can be found in a broad array of habitats from croplands, to pastures, roadsides, ditches and old fields. The plant typically grows to a height of 3–5 feet (0.9-1.5 m), but can reach 8 feet (2.4 m) in ditches and gardens.

As monarch reproduction peaks in those areas in late summer, when most A. syriaca leaves are old and tough, the plant needs to be cut back in June, July, or August, to assure that it will be regrowing rapidly, when monarch reproduction reaches its peak. Similar conditions exist for showy milkweed (A. speciosa) in Michigan and for green antelopehorn milkweed (A. viridis) where it grows in the southern Great Plains and the western United States. In addition, the seeds of A. syriaca and some other milkweeds need periods of cold treatment (cold stratification) before they will germinate.

To protect seeds from washing away during heavy rains and from seed-eating birds, one can cover the seeds with a light fabric or with an 0.5 in (13 mm) layer of straw mulch. However, mulch acts as an insulator. Thicker layers of mulch can prevent seeds from germinating if they prevent soil temperatures from rising enough when winter ends. Further, few seedlings can push through a thick layer of mulch.

Many species of milkweed contain toxic cardiac glycosides (cardenolides). Monarch caterpillars deter predators by incorporating these chemical compounds into their bodies, where the toxins remain throughout the insect's lifetime. Although monarch caterpillars will feed on butterfly weed (A. tuberosa) in butterfly gardens, it is typically not a heavily used host plant for the species. The plant contains only low levels of cardiac glycosides. This may make A. tuberosa unattractive to egg-laying monarchs. Some other milkweeds have similar characteristics.

A. tuberosa also has rough leaves and a layer of trichomes, which may inhibit oviposition or decrease a female's ability to sense leaf chemicals. As a result of these factors, reproducing monarchs lay fewer eggs on A. tuberosa than they do on most other milkweeds. While the plant's colorful flowers provide nectar for many adult butterflies, A. tuberosa may therefore be less suitable for use in butterfly gardens and monarch waystations than are other milkweed species.

Breeding monarchs prefer to lay eggs on swamp milkweed (A. incarnata). A. incarnata is therefore often planted in butterfly gardens and monarch waystations to help sustain the butterfly's populations.

However, A. incarnata is an early successional plant that usually grows at the margins of wetlands and in seasonally flooded areas. The plant is slow to spread via seeds, does not spread by runners and tends to disappear as vegetative densities increase and habitats dry out. Although A. incarnata plants can survive for up to 20 years, most live only two-five years in gardens. The species is not shade-tolerant and is not a good vegetative competitor.

== Butterflies and moths at typical nectar-foodplants ==
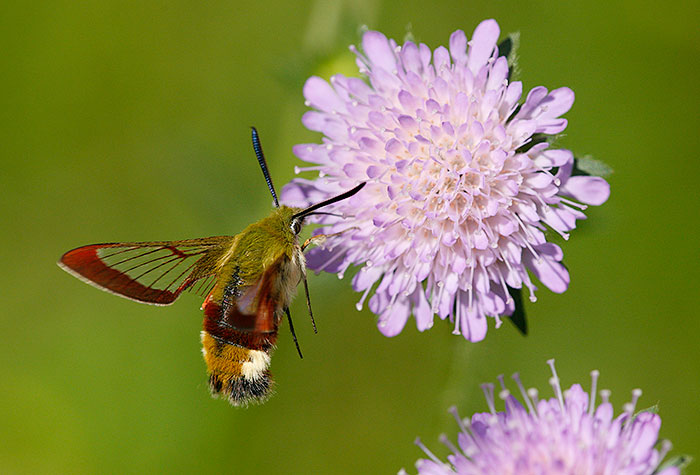
Hemaris fuciformis hovering at Scabiosa

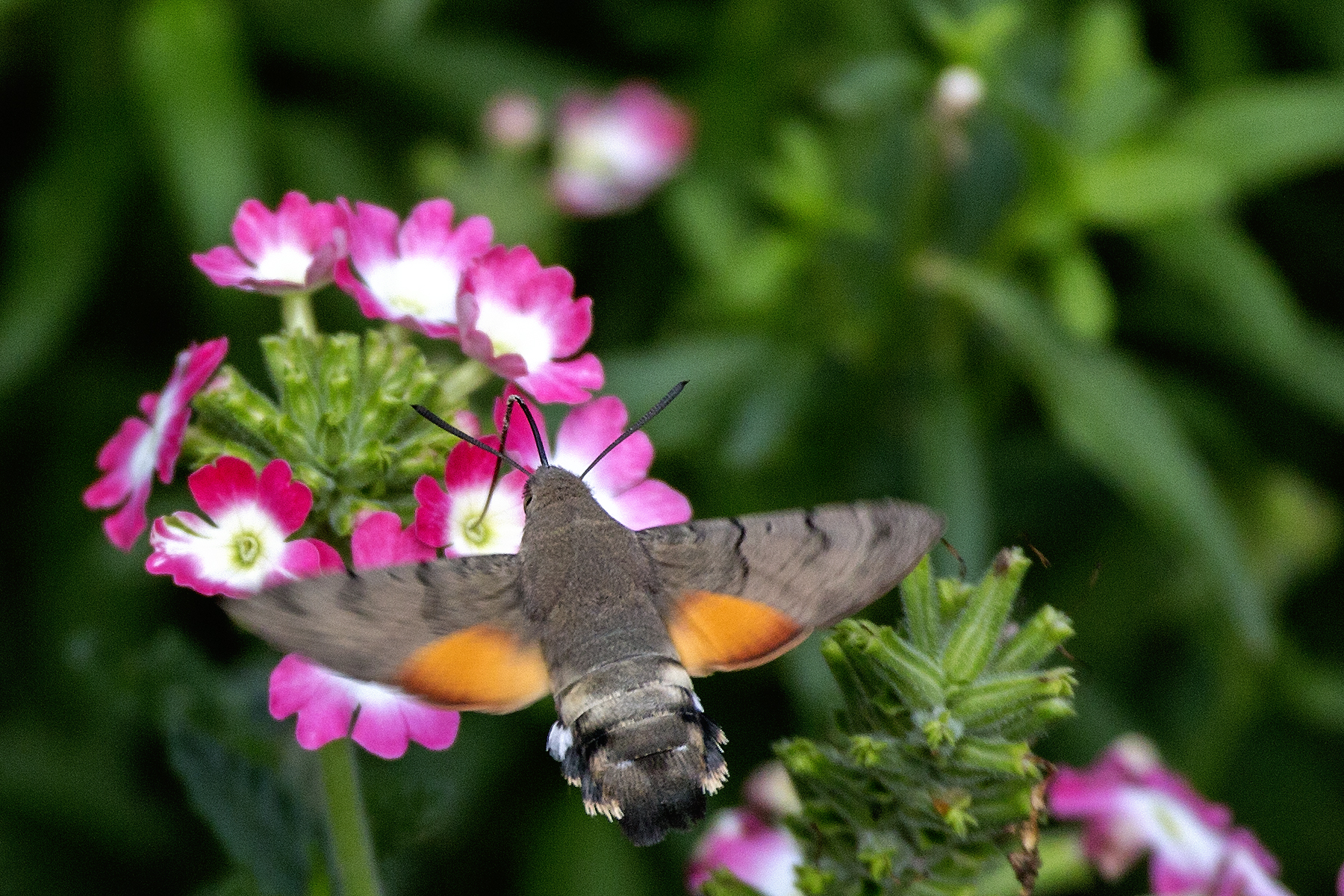
Macroglossum stellatarum hovering at Verbena

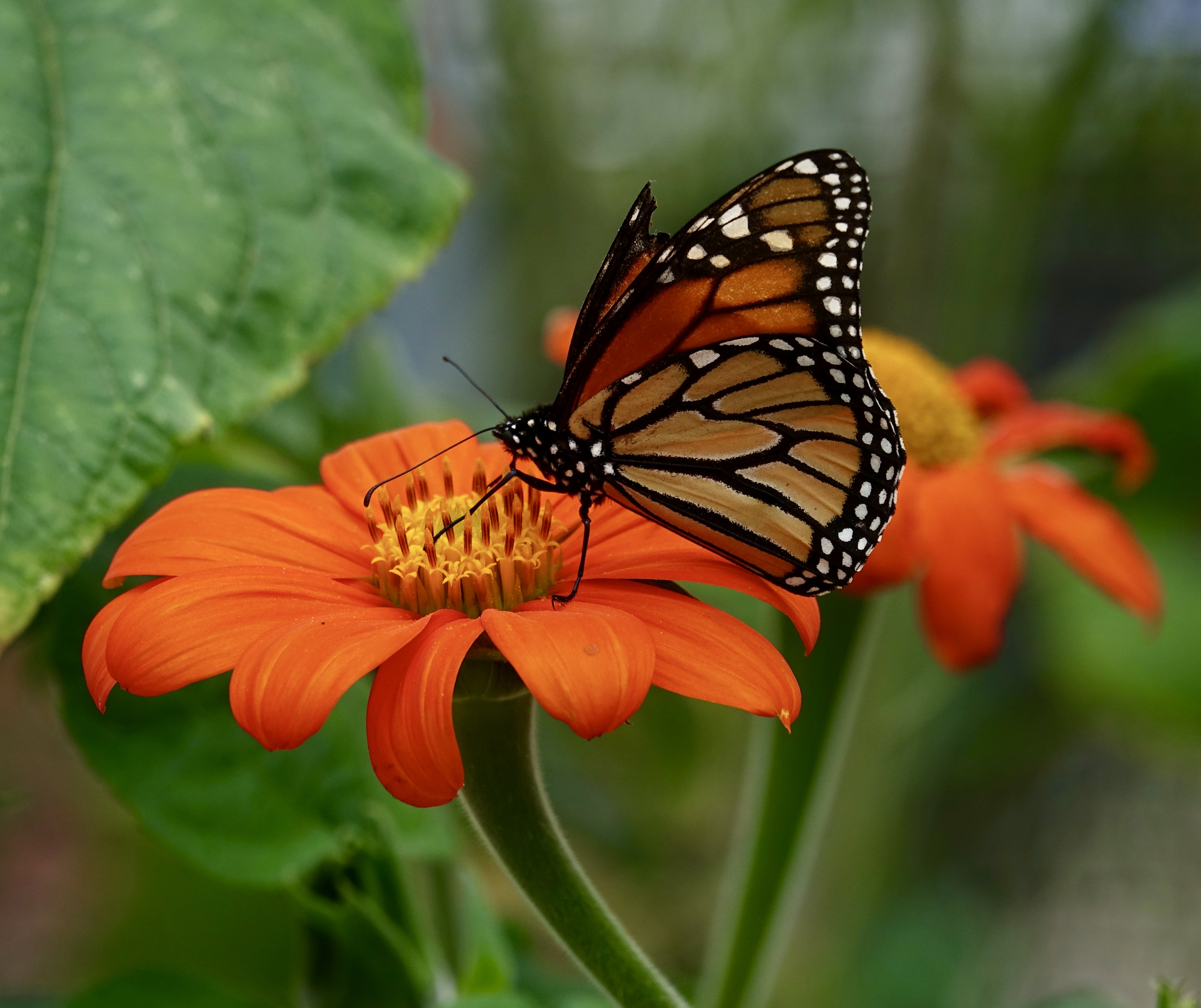
Danaus plexippus nectaring on Mexican sunflower (Tithonia rotundifolia)

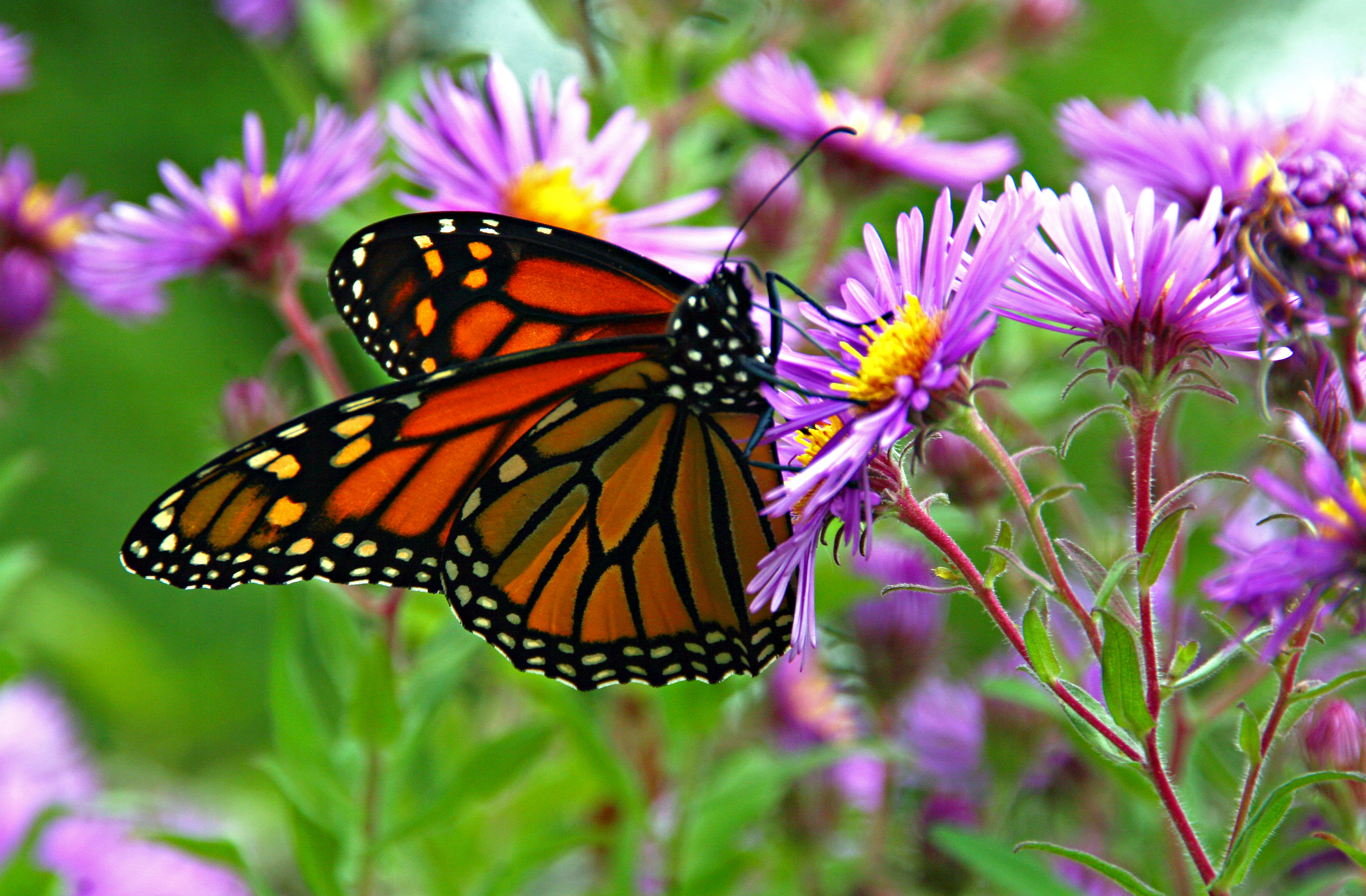
Danaus plexippus on Asterales

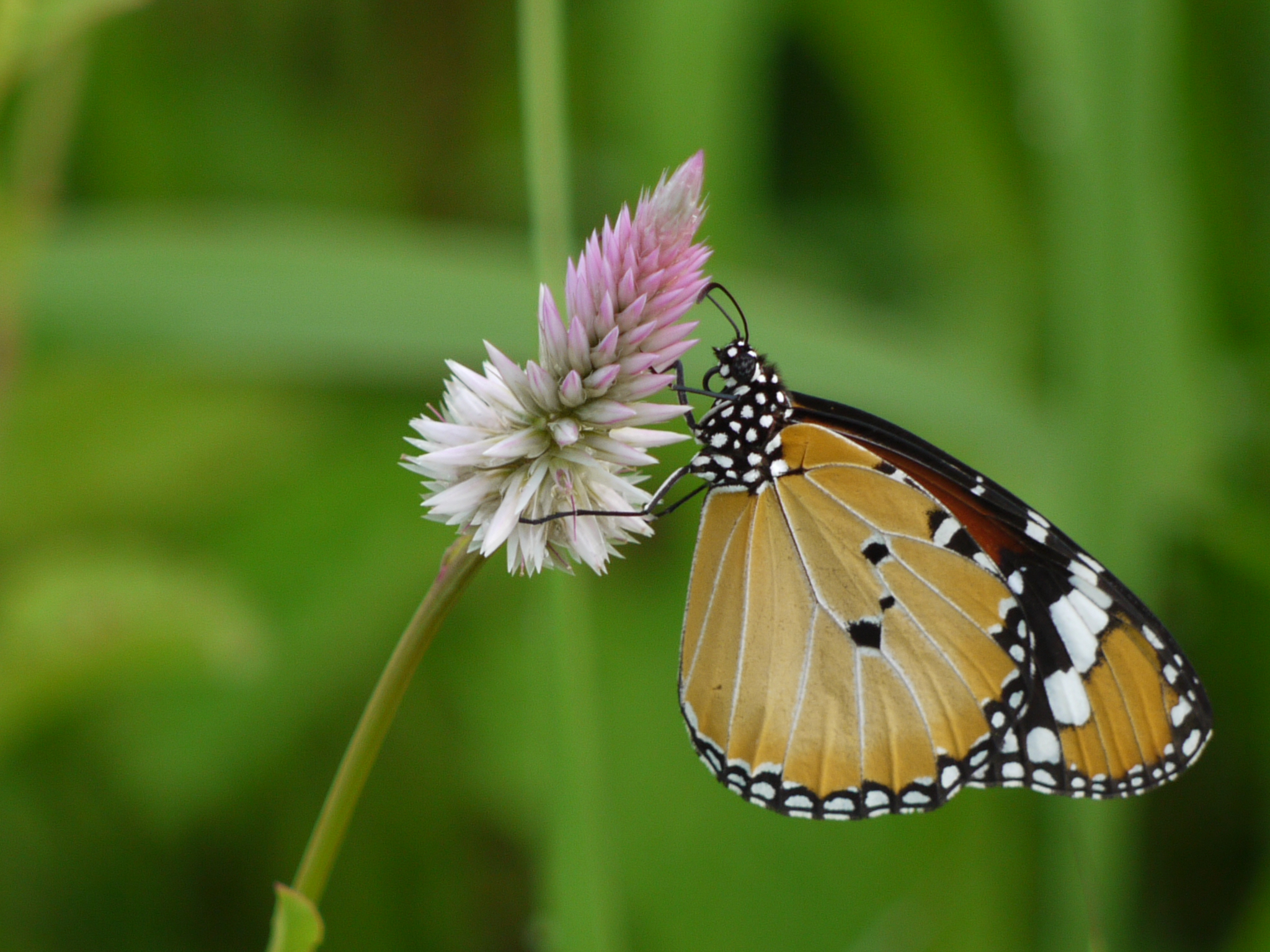
Danaus chrysippus on Celosia

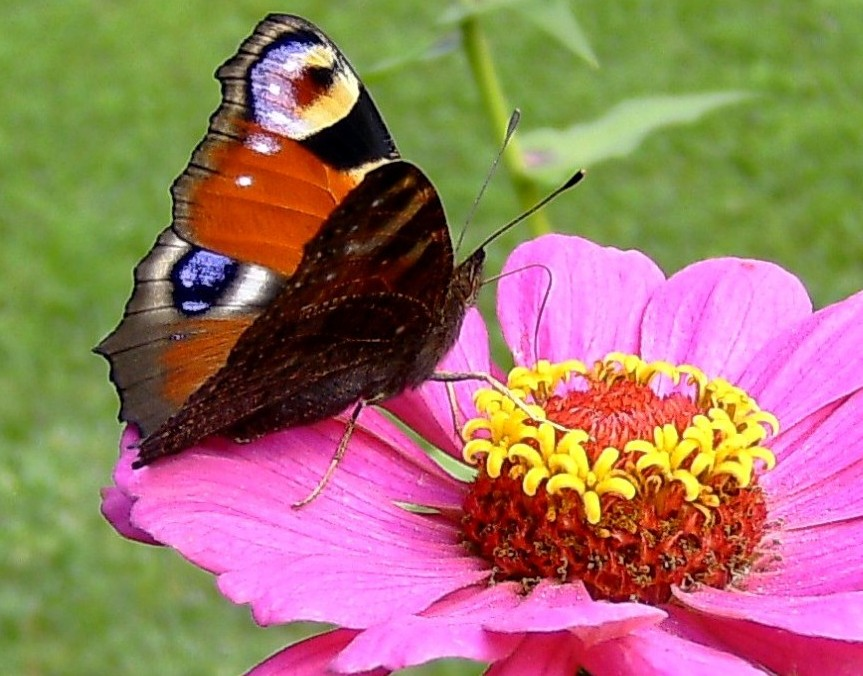
Aglais io on Zinnia elegans

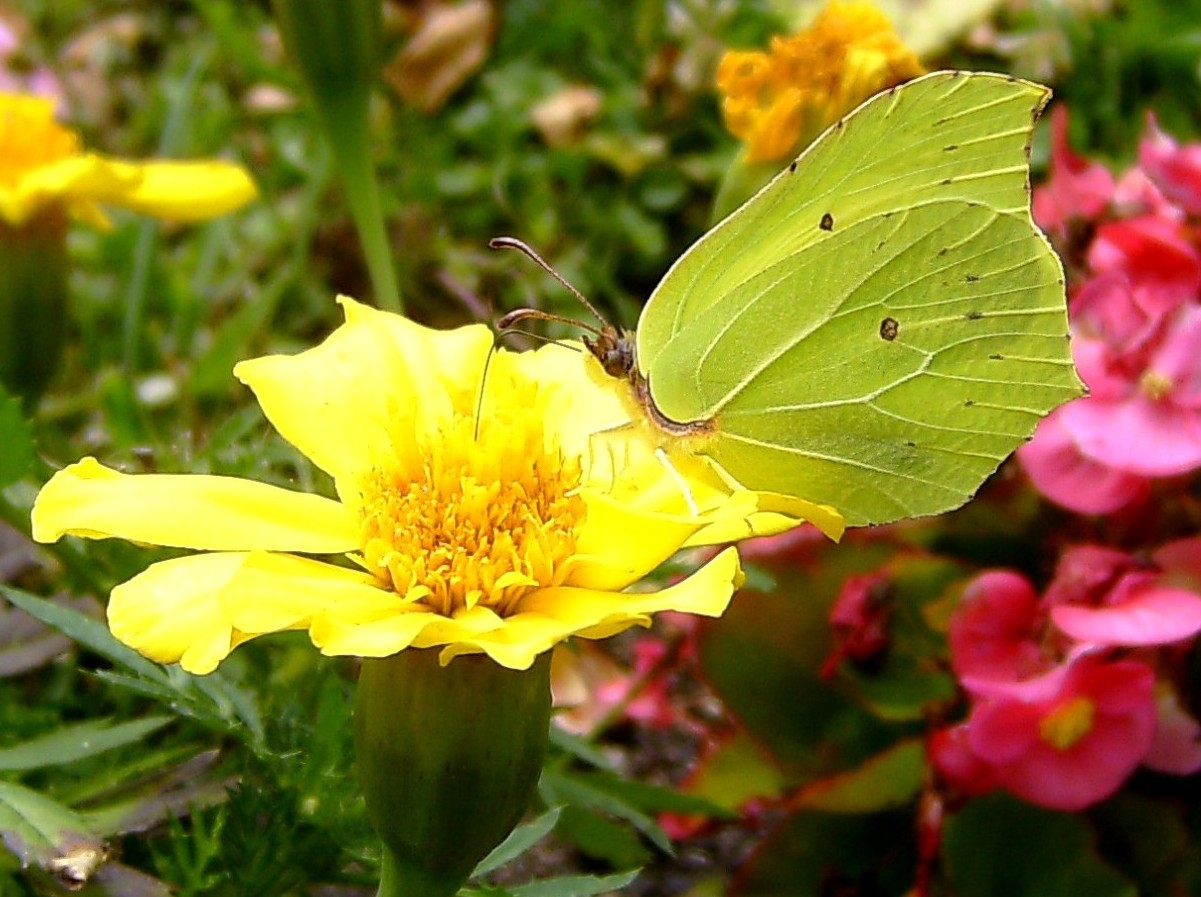
Gonepteryx rhamni, on Tagetes

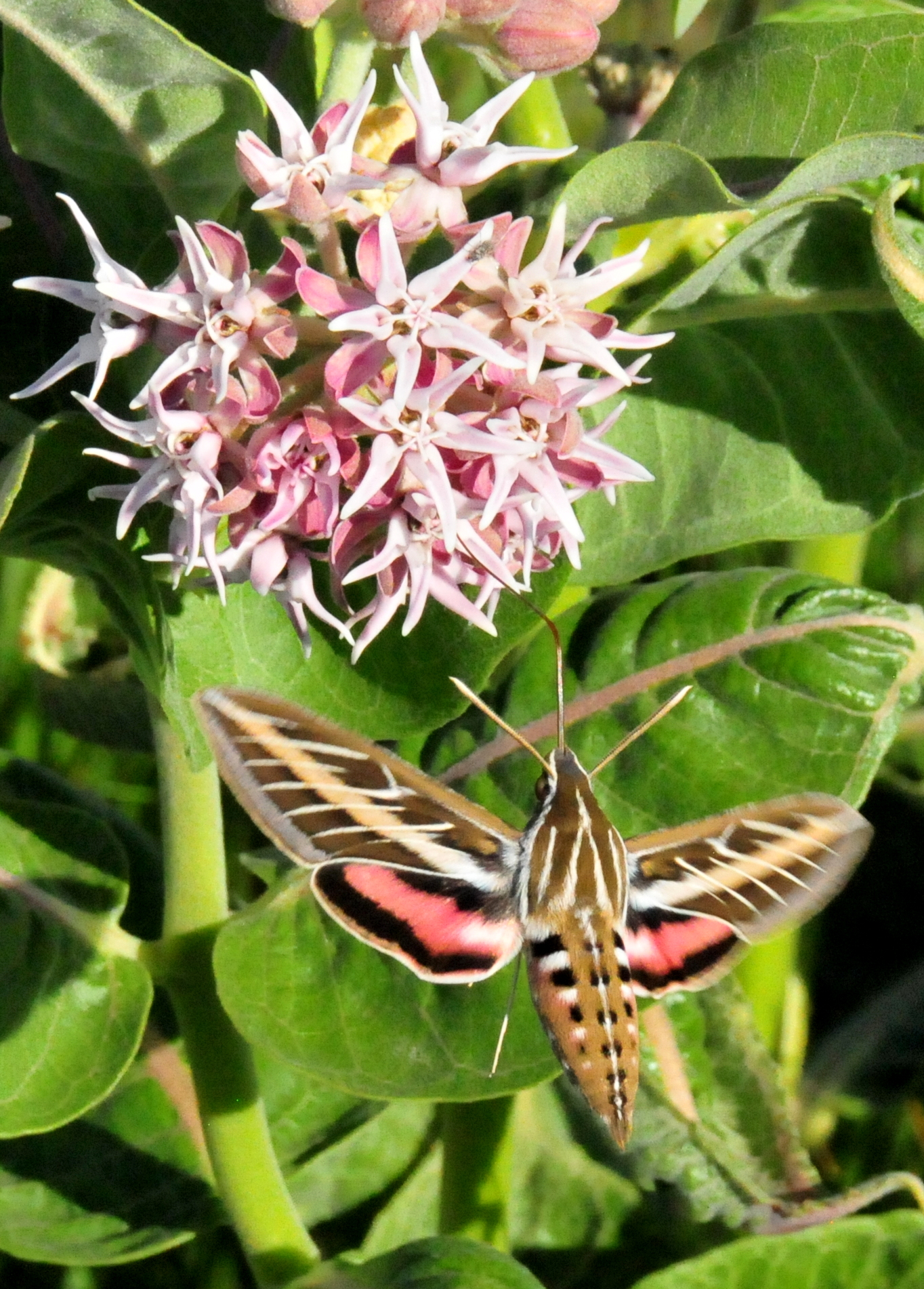
Hyles lineata hovering at milkweed (Asclepias)

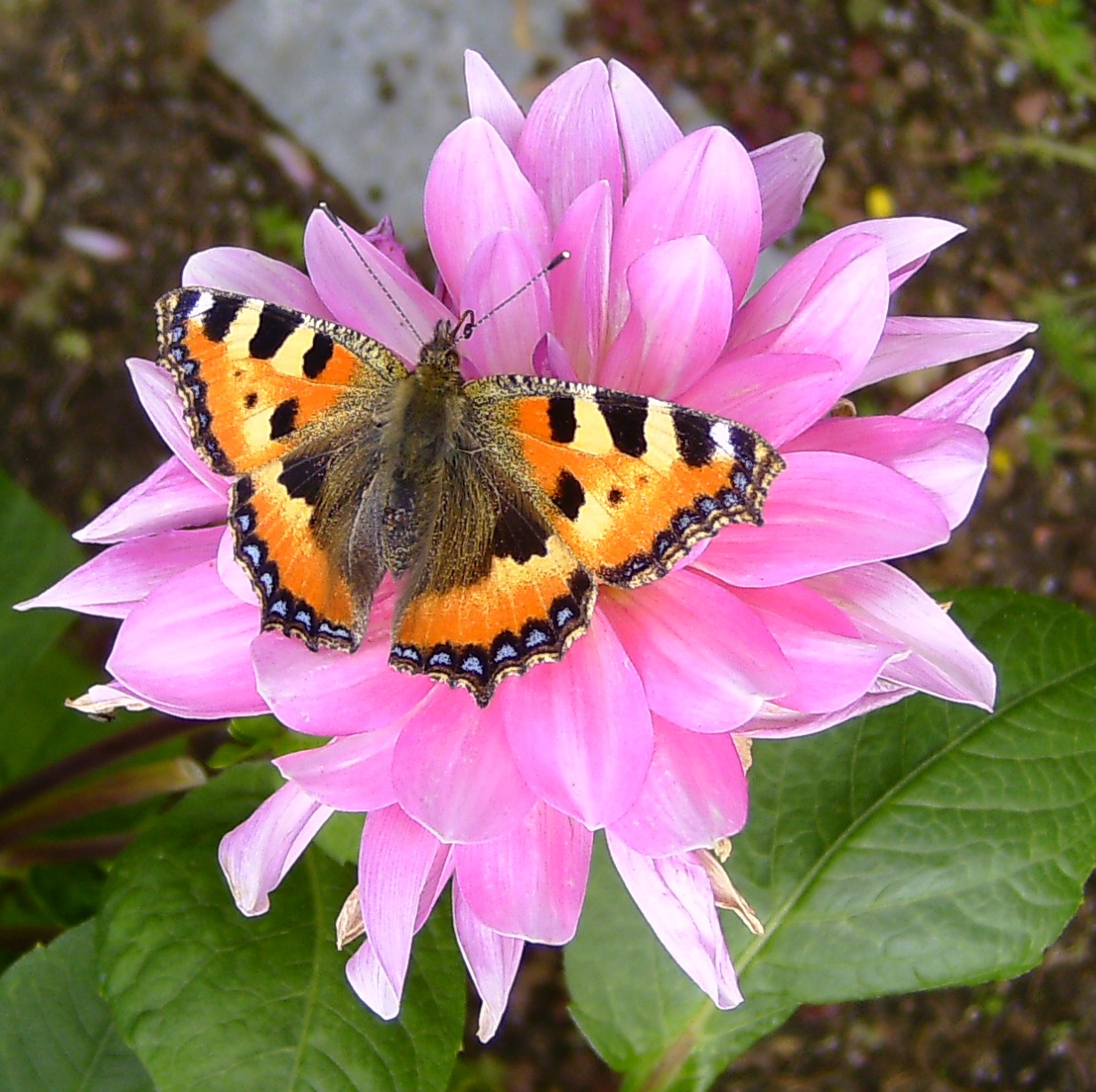
Aglais urticae on Dahlia

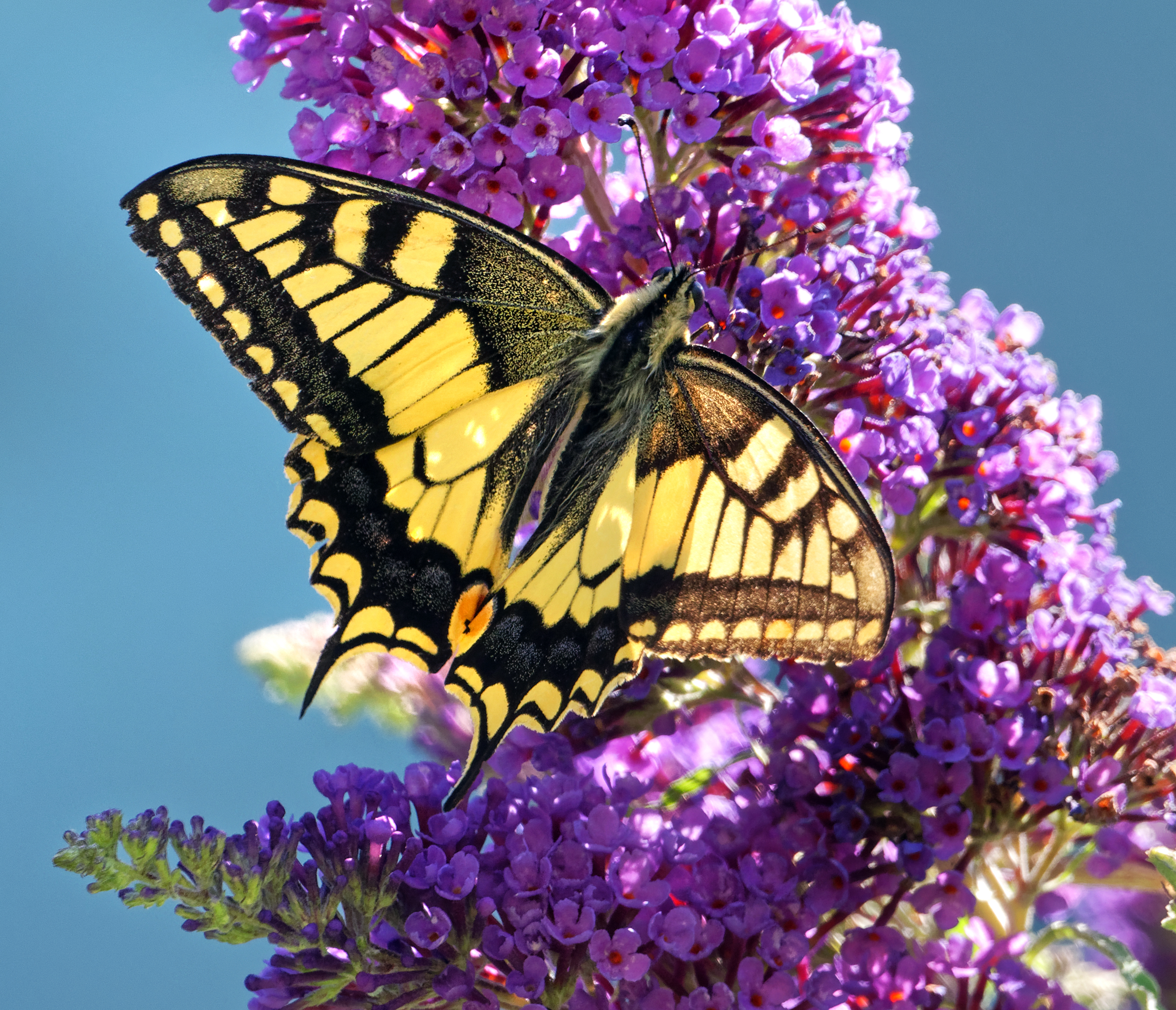
Papilio machaon on Buddleja

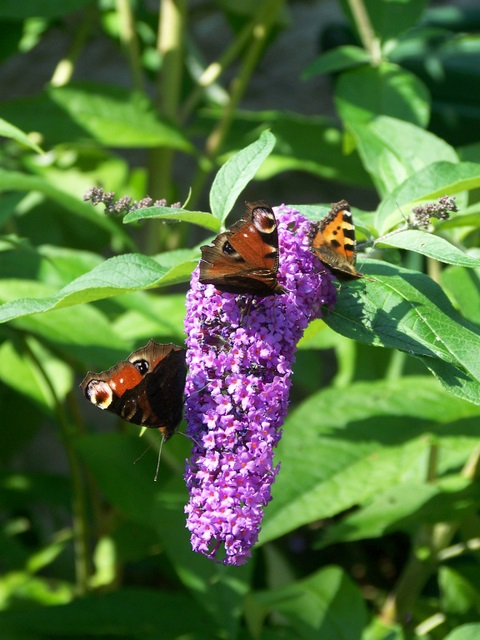
Two Aglais io and an Aglais urticae on Buddleja

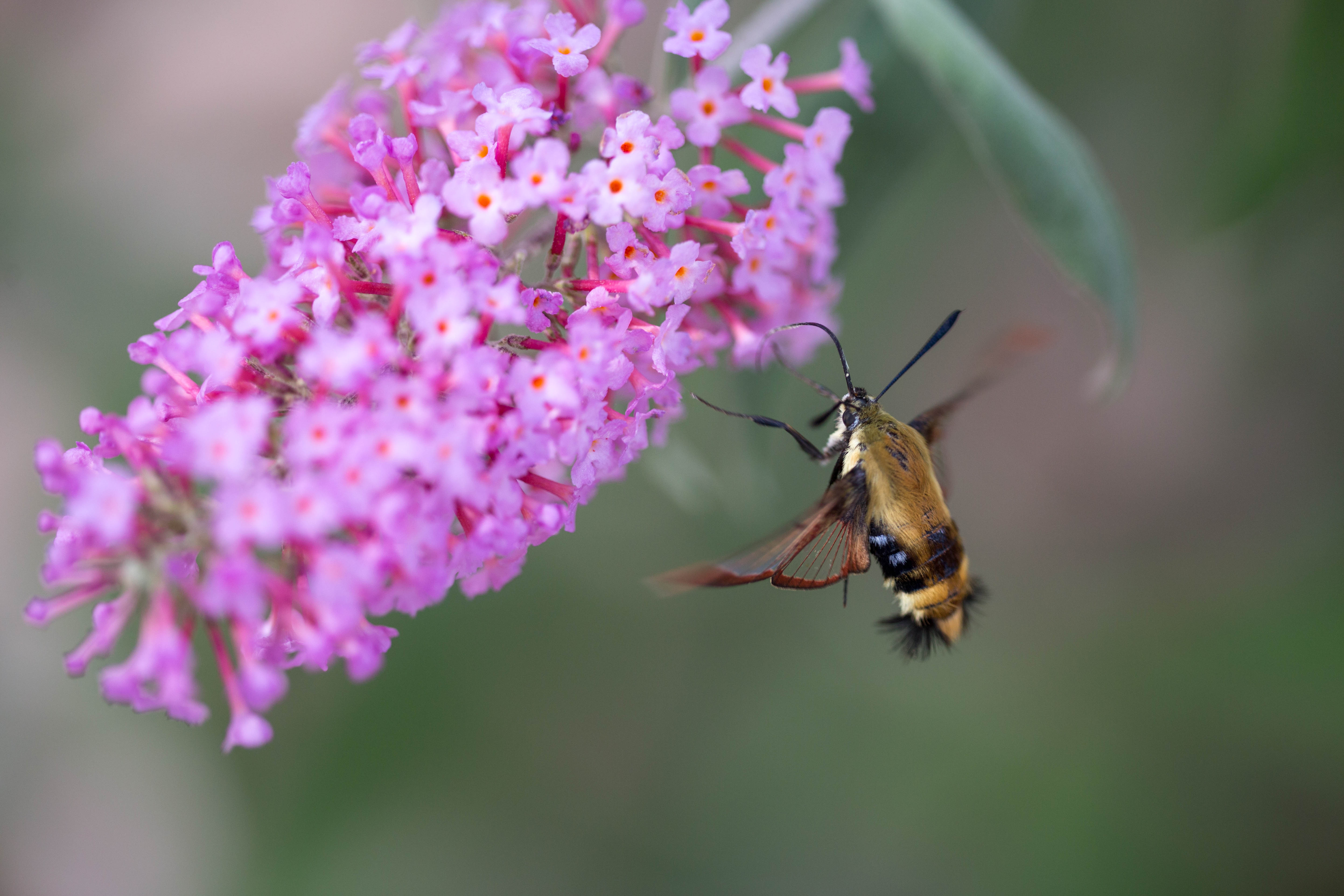
Hemaris diffinis hovering at Buddleja

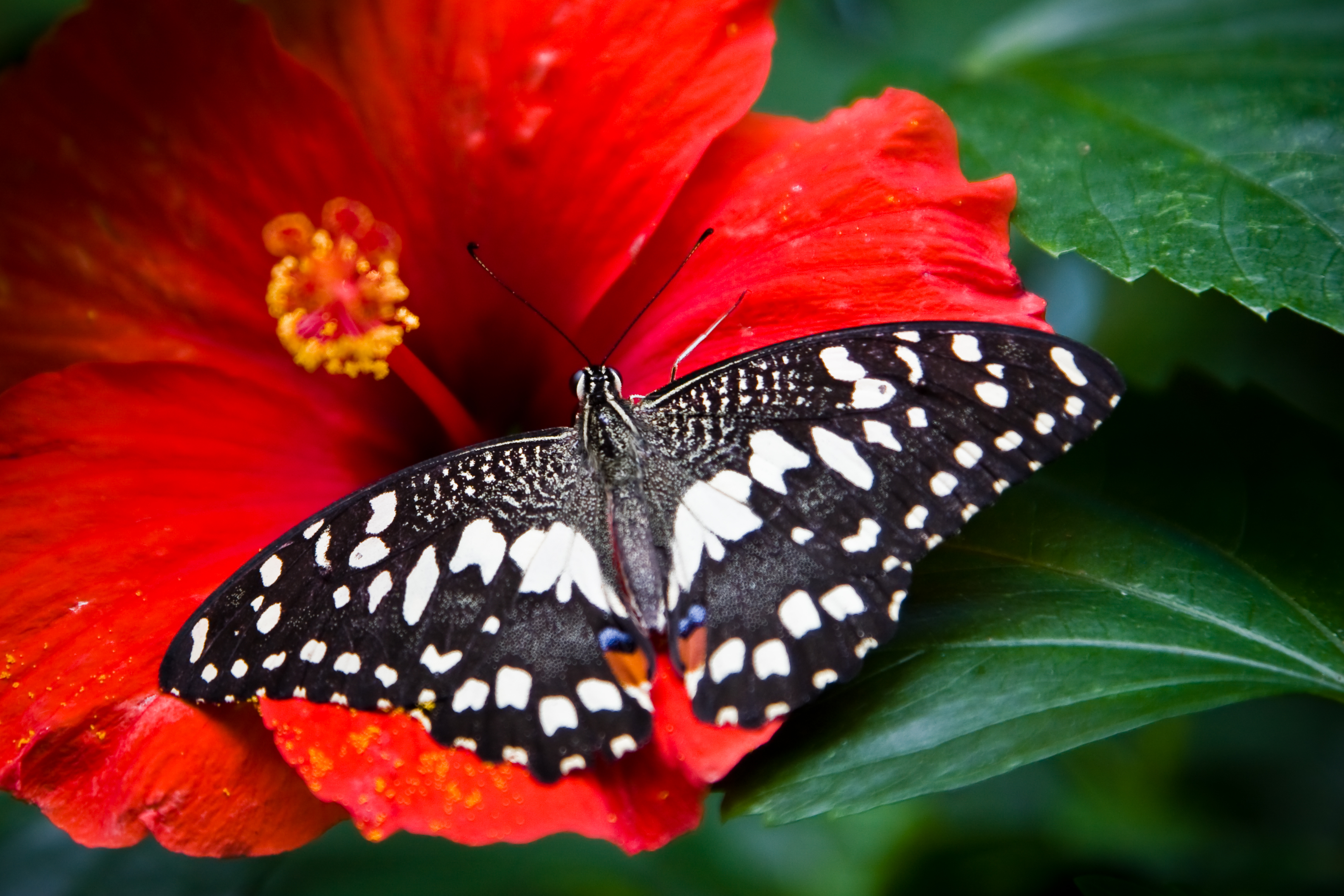
Papilio demoleus on Hibiscus

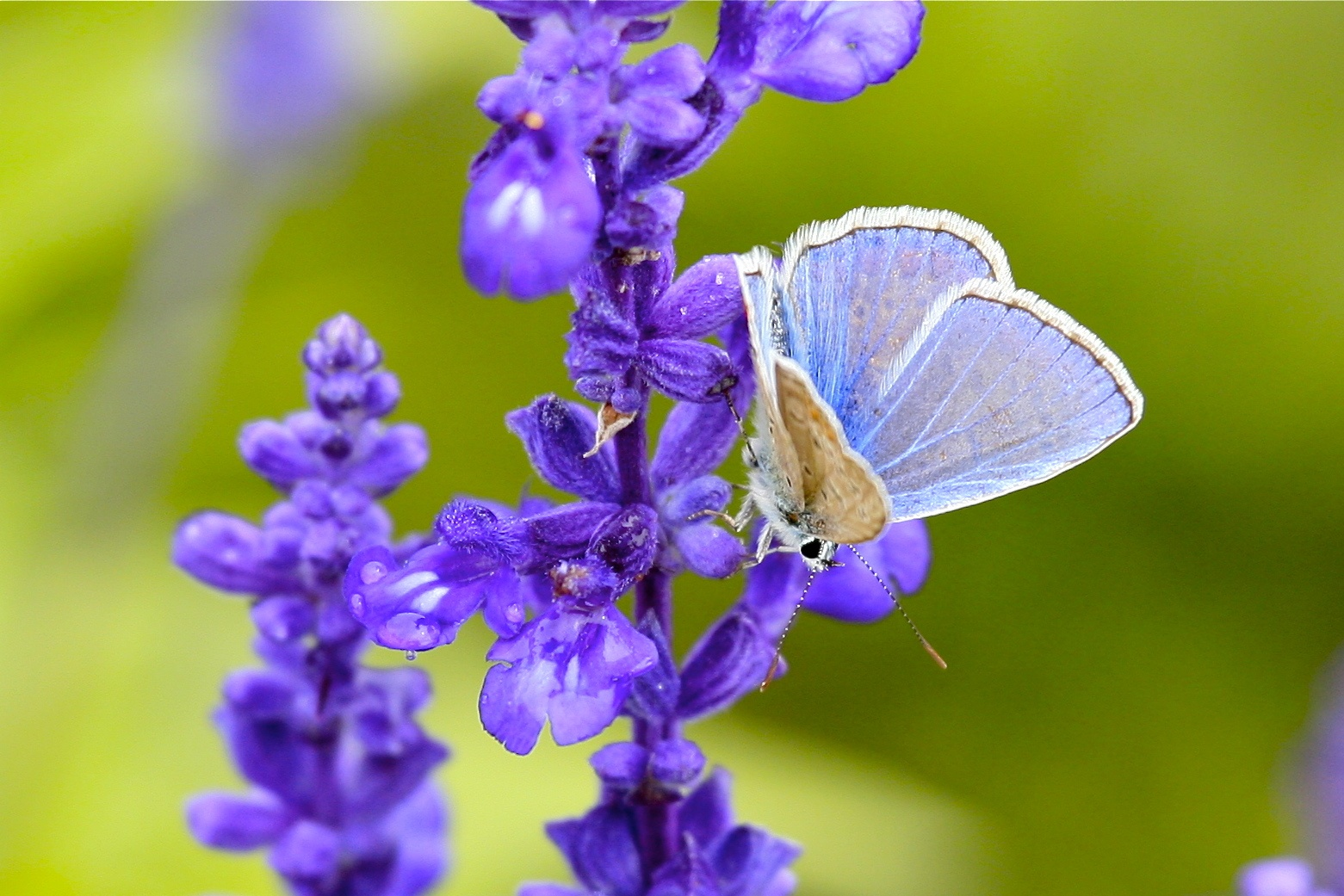
Polyommatus icarus on Lavandula

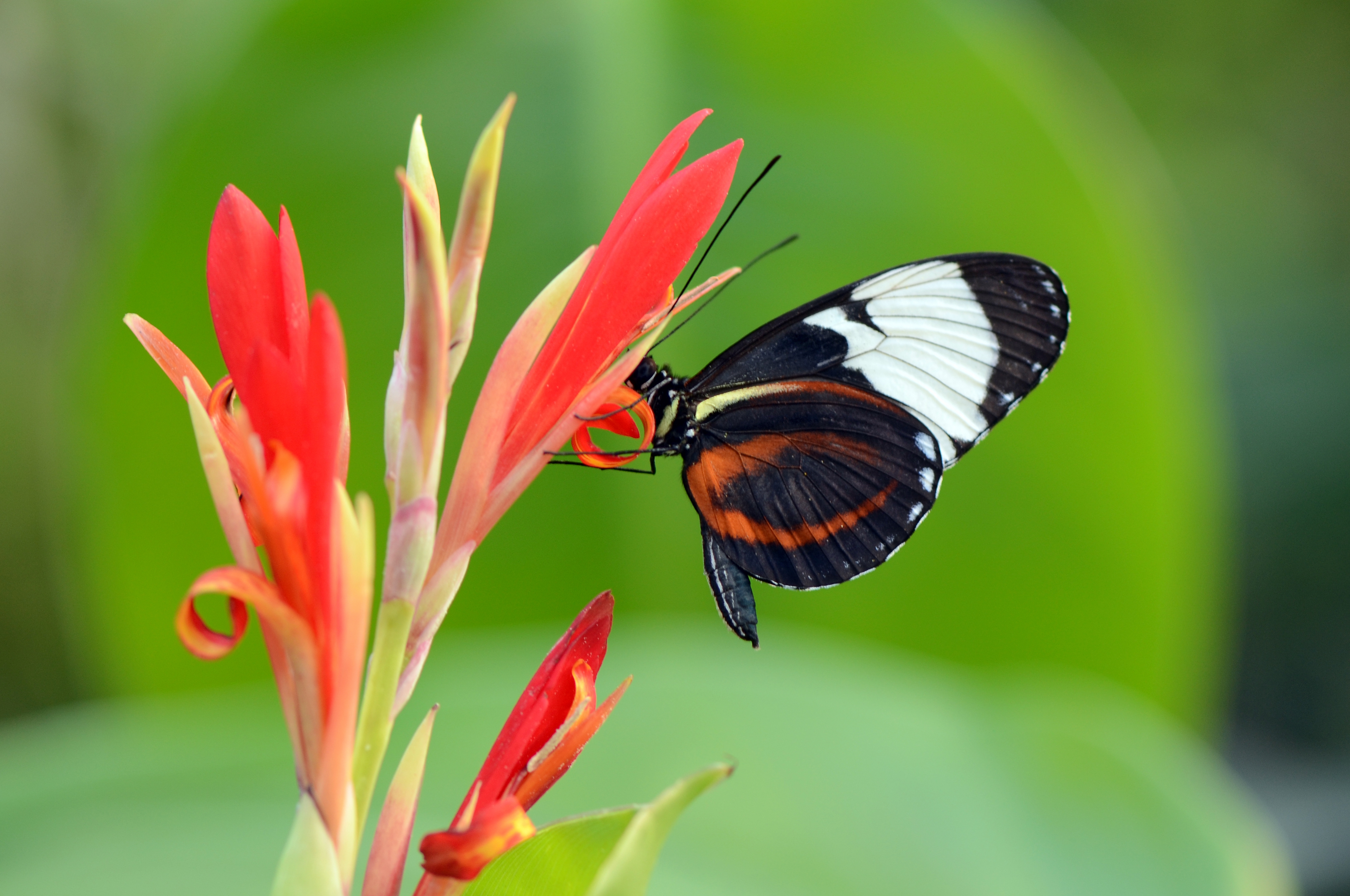
Heliconius cydno on Zingiberales

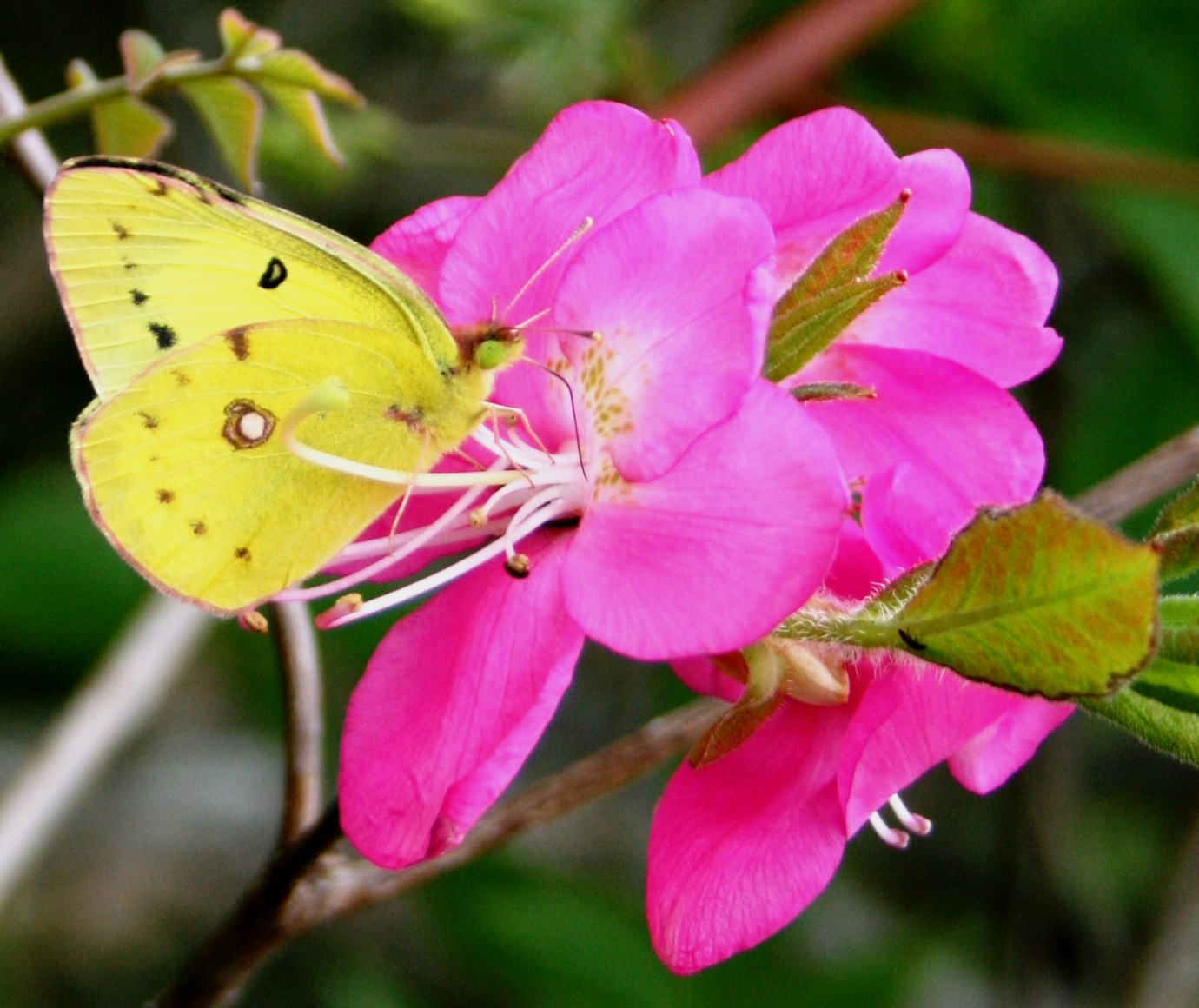
Colias erate on Rhododendron

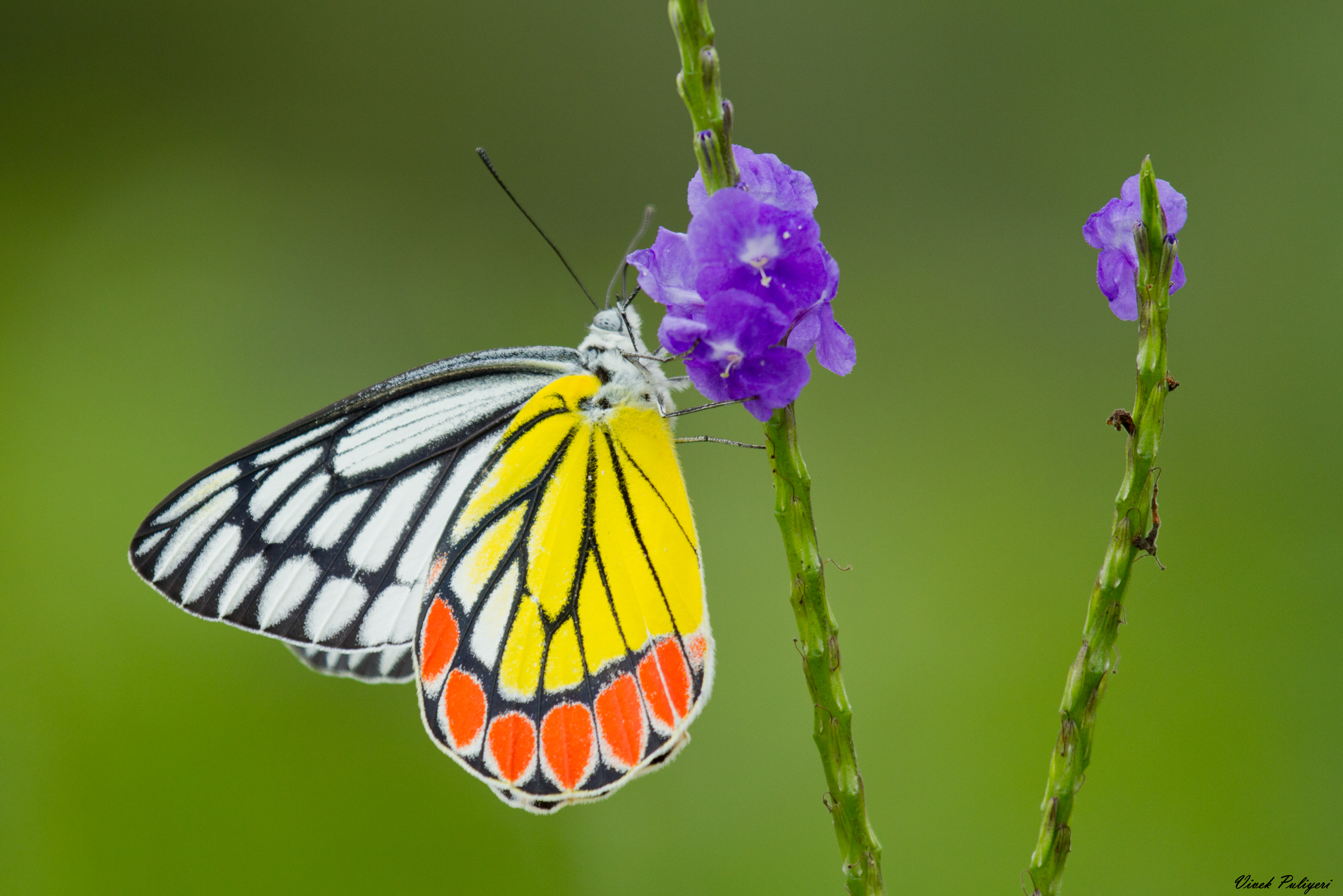
Delias eucharis on Stachytarpheta

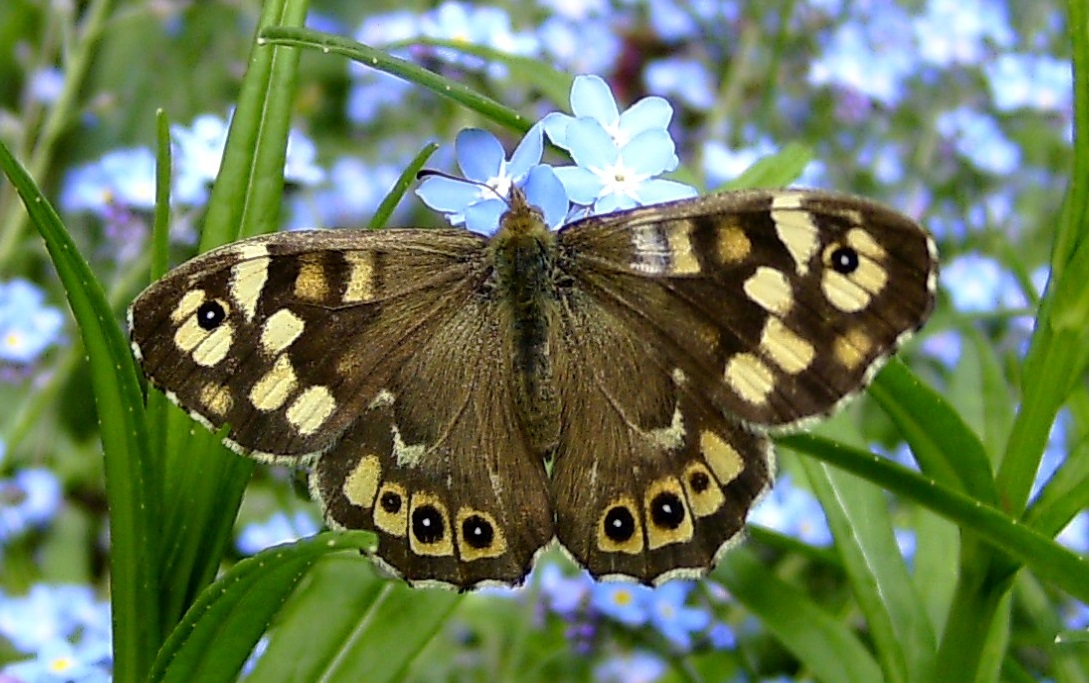
Pararge aegeria on Myosotis

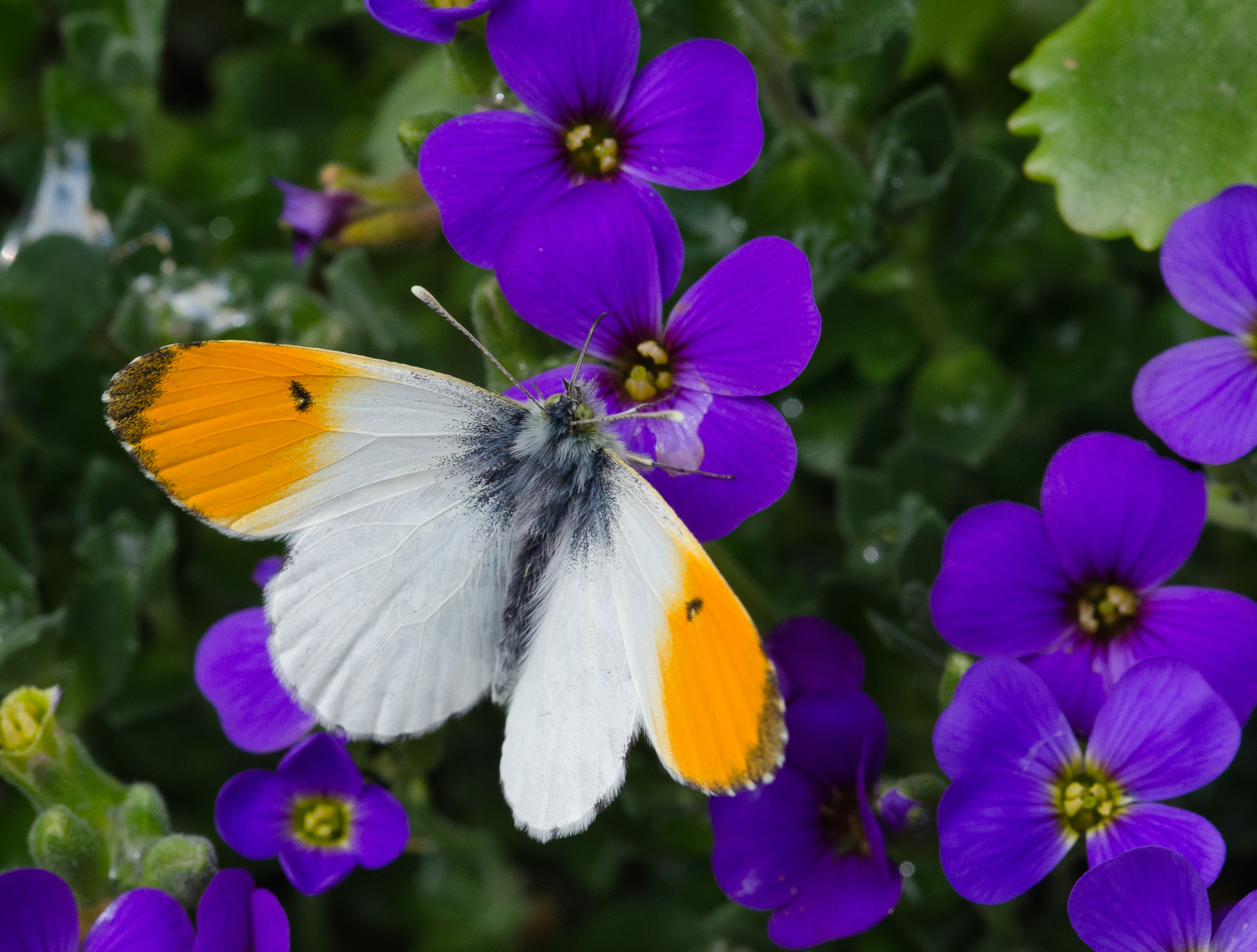
Anthocharis cardamines on Aubrieta

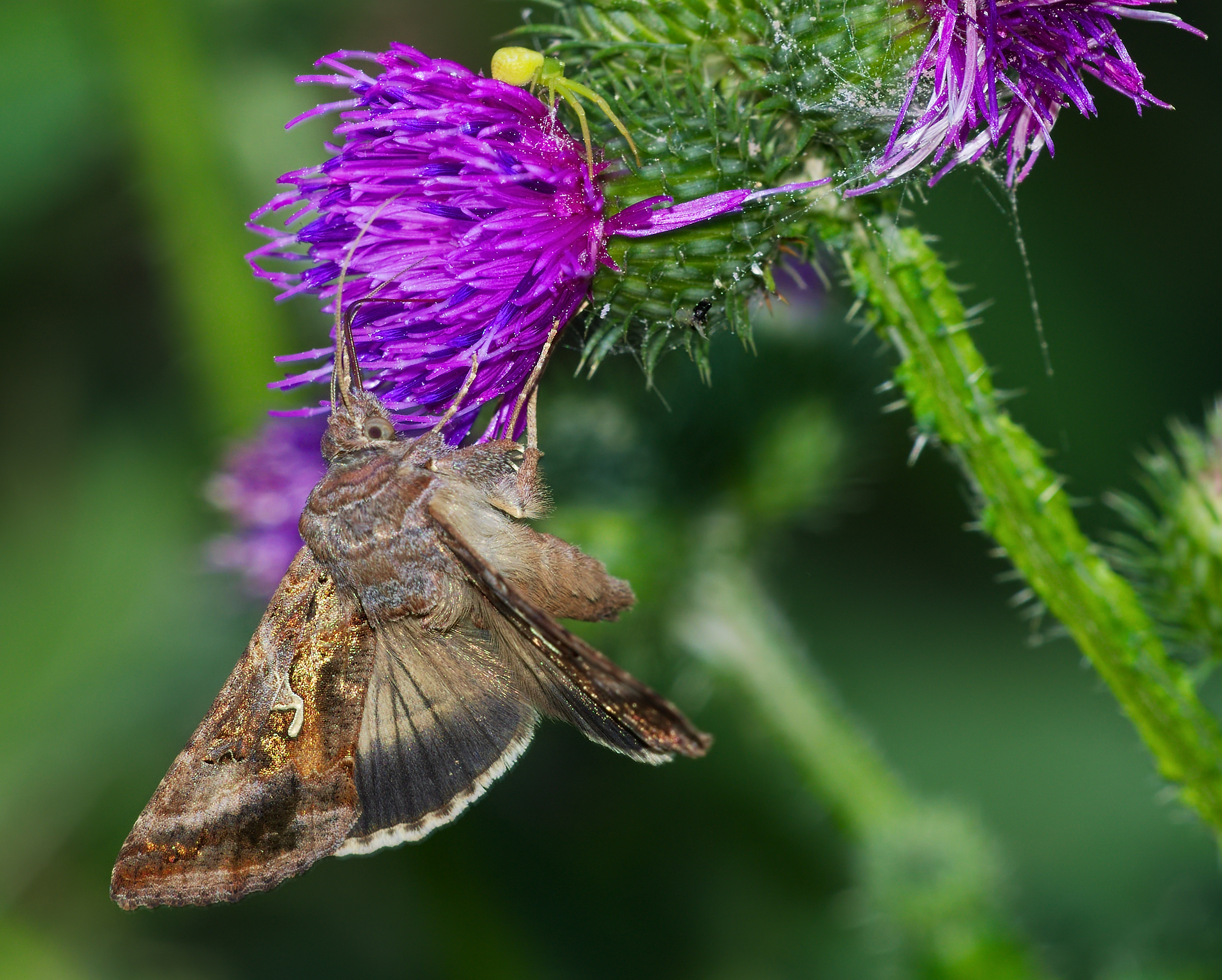
Autographa gamma on Carduoideae

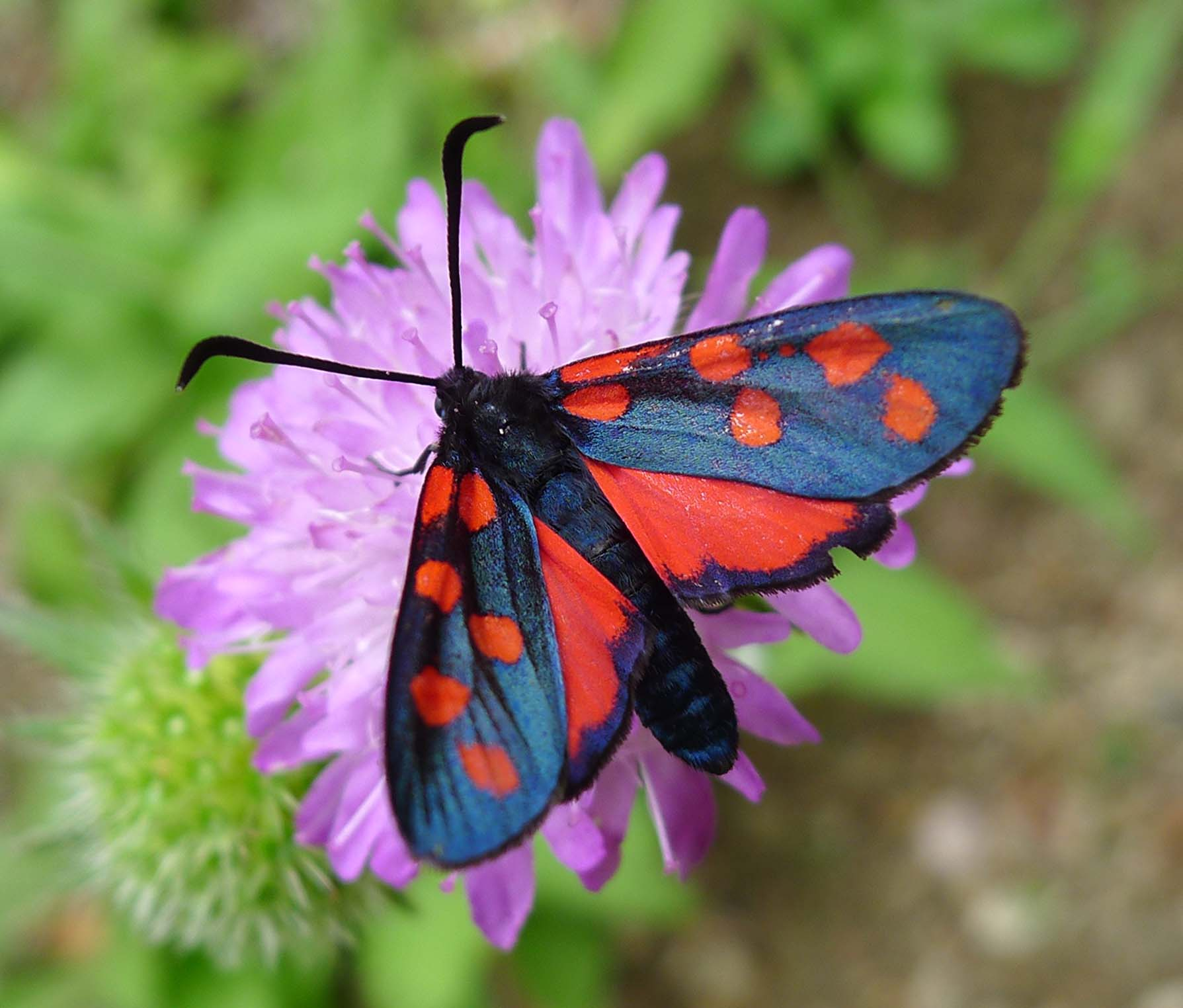
Zygaena transalpina on Knautia

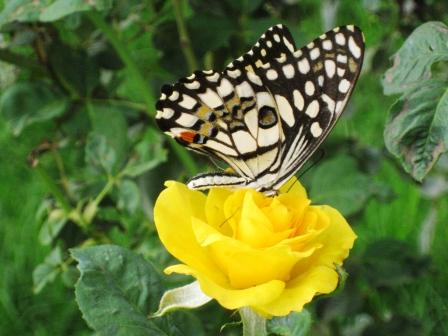
Papilio demoleus on Rose

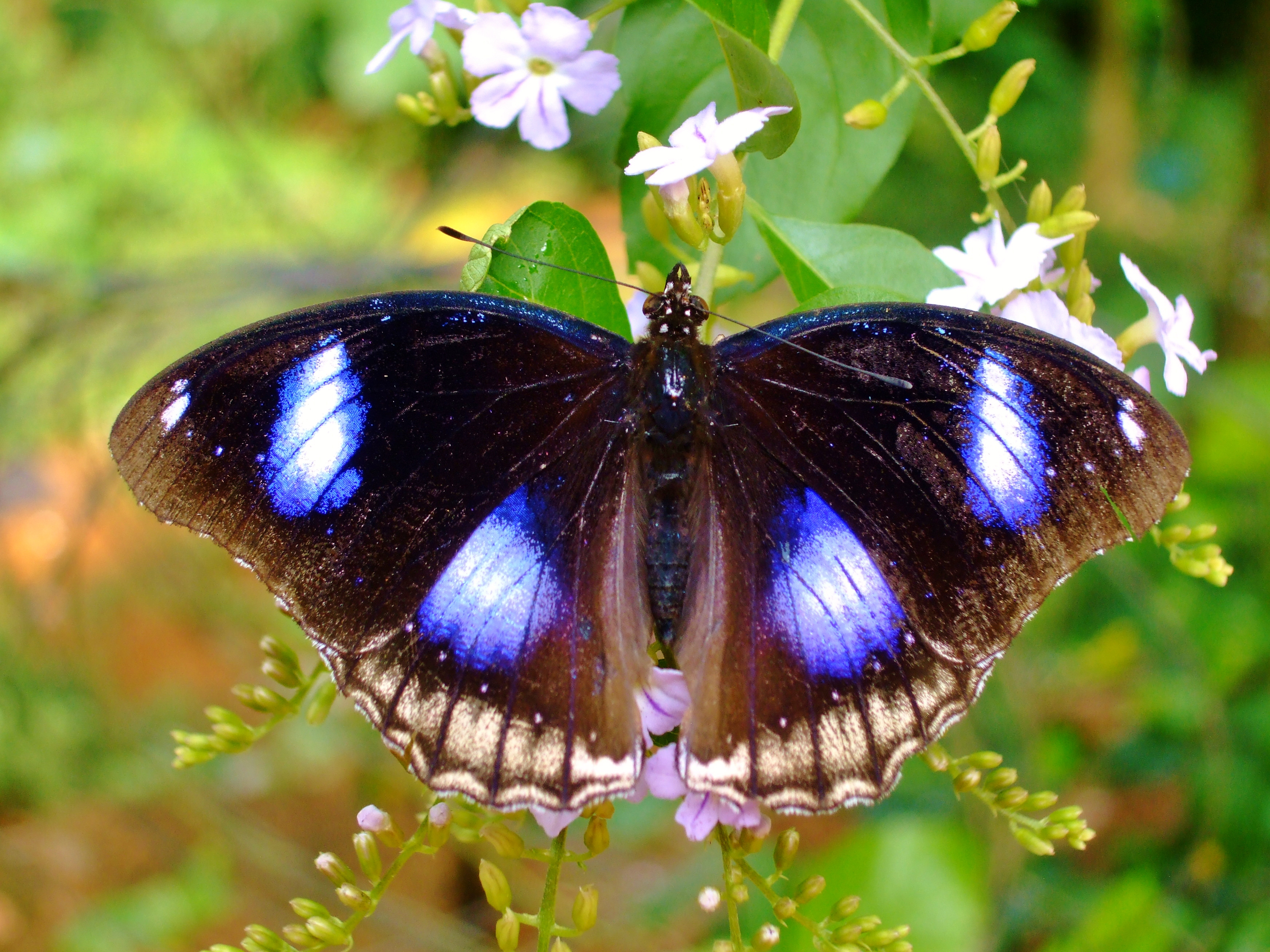
Hypolimnas bolina on Duranta

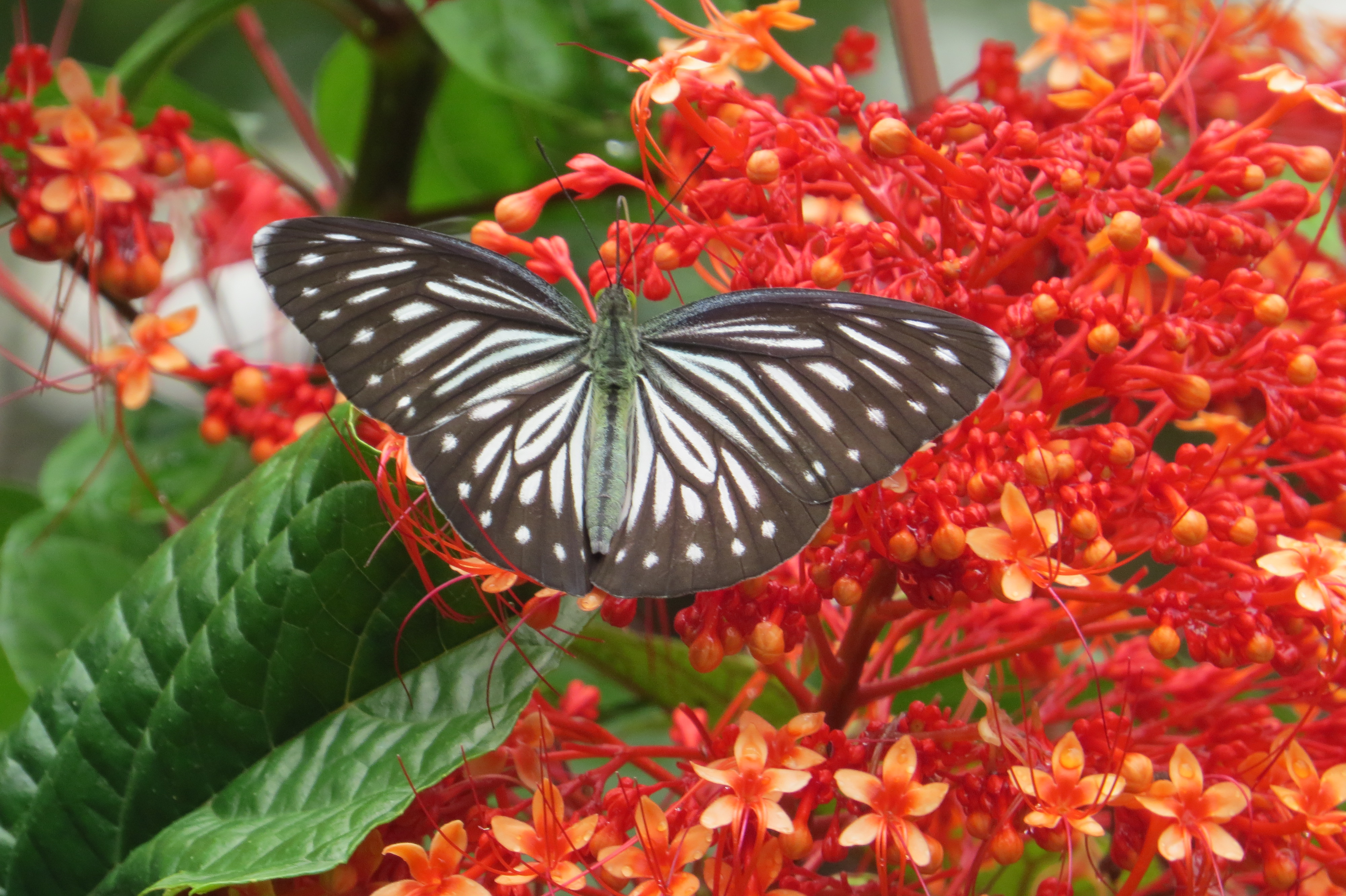
Pareronia hippia on Clerodendrum

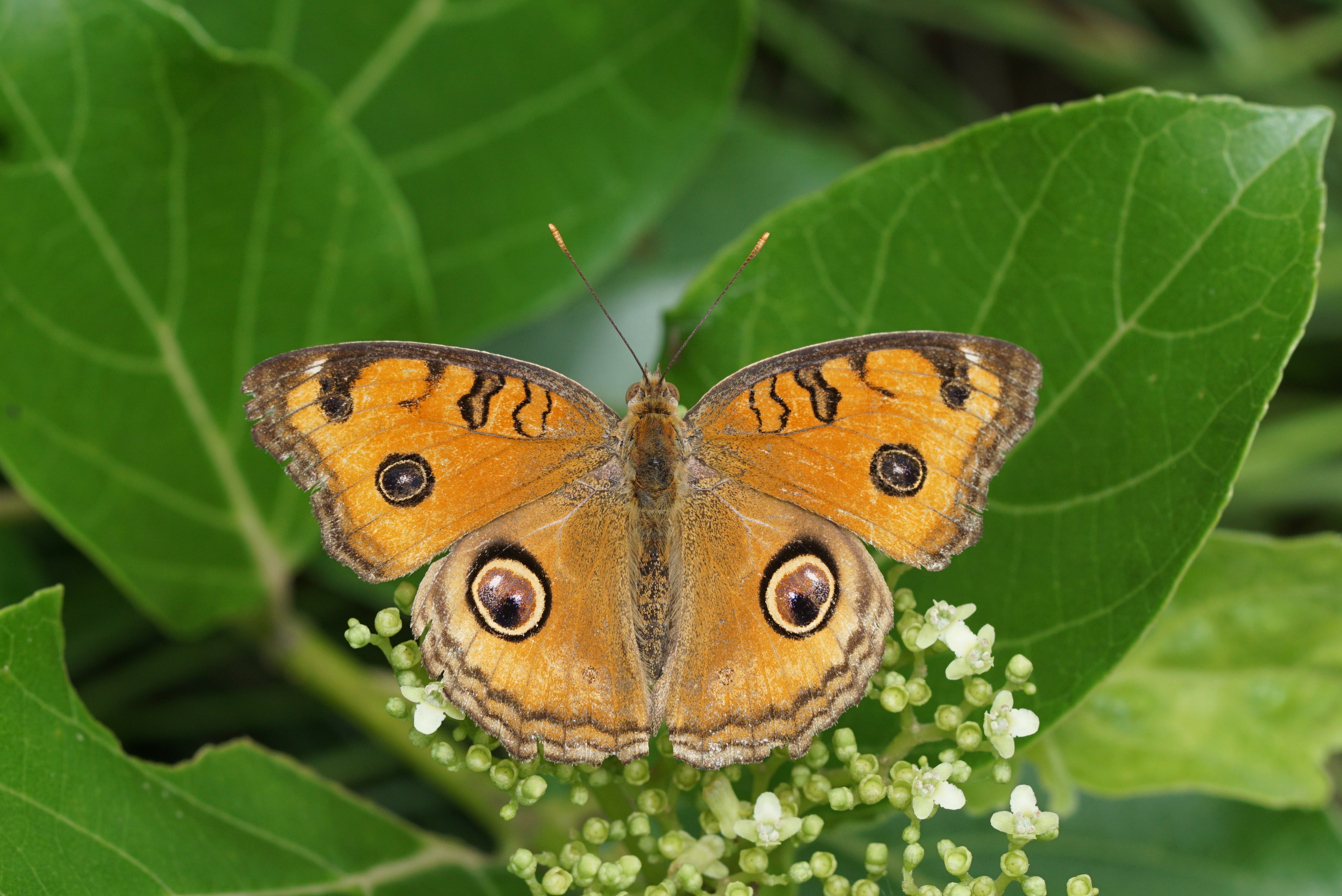
Junonia almana on Angiosperm

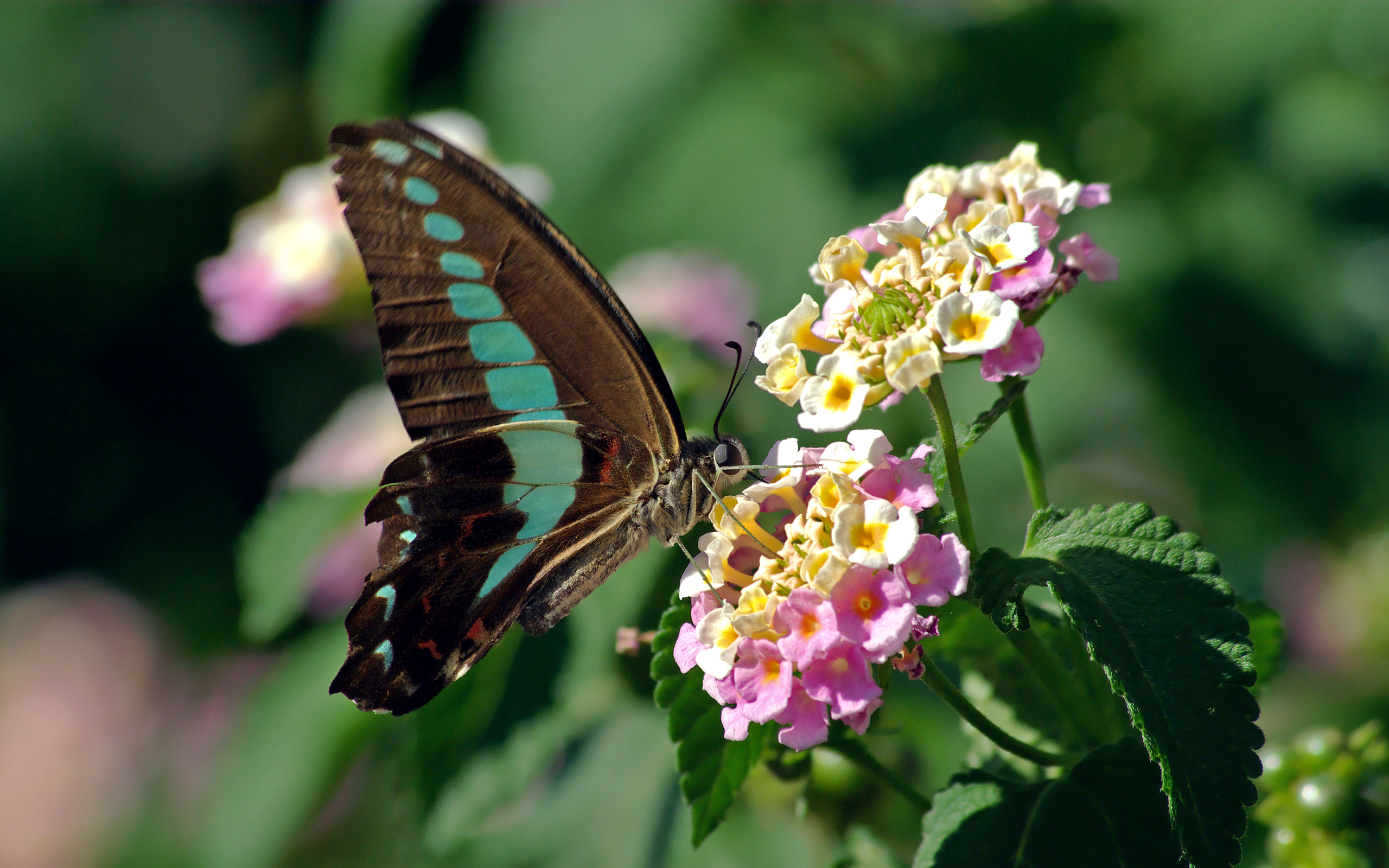
Graphium sarpedon on Lantana

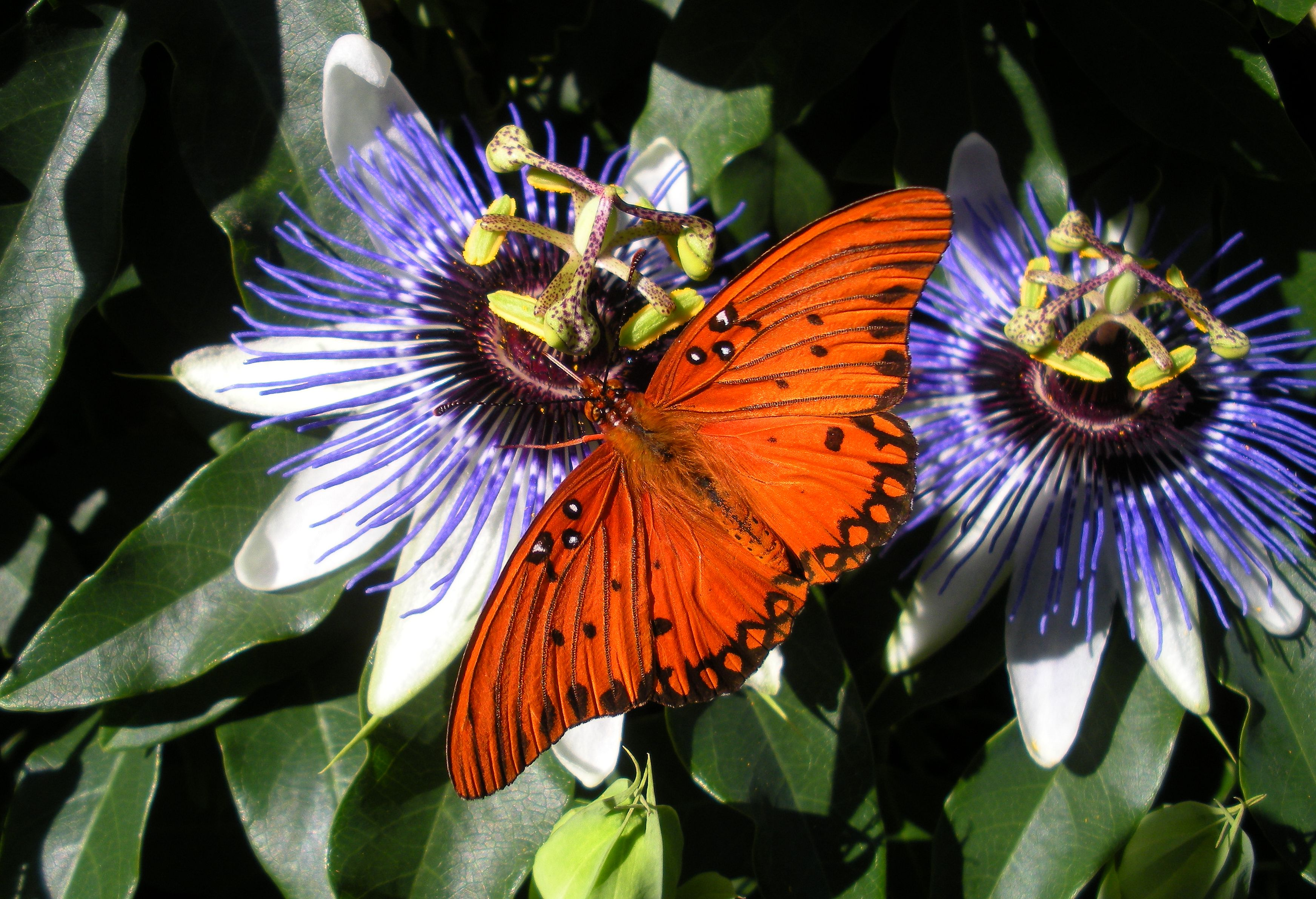
Agraulis vanillae on Passiflora

== Books ==
- Black, Scott Hoffman; Xerces Society (2016). Gardening For Butterflies: How You Can Attract And Protect Beautiful, Beneficial Insects. Portland, Oregon: Timber Press. ISBN 978-1-60469-761-2. LCCN 2015029810. OCLC 945564211 – via Google Books.
- Borders, Brianna; Lee–Mäder, Eric (2014). "Milkweed Propagation and Seed Production" (PDF). Milkweeds: A Conservation Practitioner's Guide: Plant Ecology, Seed Production Methods, and Habitat Restoration Opportunities. Portland, Oregon: The Xerces Society for Invertebrate Conservation. Archived from the original (PDF) on July 4, 2021.
- Emmel, Thomas C. (1997). Butterfly Gardening: Creating A Butterfly Haven In Your Garden. Vancouver, Canada: Cavendish Books. ISBN 0-929050-87-8. OCLC 1255750975 – via Internet Archive.
- Glassberg, Jeffrey (1995). Enjoying butterflies more: attract butterflies to your backyard. Marietta, Ohio: Bird Watcher's Digest Press. ISBN 1-880241-08-0. LCCN 96202681. OCLC 35808599 – via Google Books.
- Hurwitz, Jane (2018). Butterfly Gardening: The North American Butterfly Association Guide. Princeton, New Jersey: Princeton University Press. ISBN 978-1-4008-8936-5. LCCN 2017958516. OCLC 1017925007 – via Google Books.
- Kline, Christopher (2015). Butterfly Gardening with Native Plants: How to Attract and Identify Butterflies. New York: Skyhorse Publishing. ISBN 978-1-63220-930-6. OCLC 904406951 – via Google Books.
- Krischik, Vera A.; Minnesota Extension Service (1996). Butterfly Gardening. St. Paul, Minnesota: University of Minnesota: Minnesota Extension Service, University of Minnesota. ISBN 978-1-888440-04-1. OCLC 762548490 – via Google Books.
- Lewis, Alcinda C., ed. (1995). Butterfly Gardens: Luring Nature's Loveliest Pollinators To Your Yard. Brooklyn, New York: Brooklyn Botanic Garden. ISBN 0-945352-88-3. OCLC 1148022089. Handbook #143 – via Internet Archive.
- Mader, Eric; Shepherd, Mathew; Vaughan, Mace; Black, Scott Hoffman; LeBuhn, Gretchen (2011). Attracting Native Pollinators: Protecting North America's Bees and Butterflies: The Xerces Society guide. North Adams, Massachusetts: Storey Publishing. ISBN 978-1-60342-747-0. LCCN 2010043054. OCLC 776997073 – via Internet Archive.
- Rothschild, Miriam; Farrell, Clive (1983). The Butterfly Gardener. London: Michael Joseph/Rainbird. ISBN 0-7181-2258-5. LCCN 83670183. OCLC 988155044 – via Google Books.
- Schneck, Marcus (1994). Creating A Butterfly Garden: A Guide To Attracting And Identifying Butterfly Visitors. Fireside Books. New York: Simon & Schuster. ISBN 0-671-89246-0. LCCN 93039582. OCLC 29386562 – via Google Books.
- Sedenko, Jerry (1991). The Butterfly Garden: Creating Beautiful Gardens To Attract Butterflies. New York: Villard Books. ISBN 0-394-58982-3. OCLC 988338233 – via Internet Archive.
- Stokes, Donald W.; Stokes, Lillian Q.; Williams, Ernest H. (1991). The Butterfly Book: An Easy Guide To Butterfly Gardening, Identification, And Behavior. Boston: Little, Brown and Company. ISBN 0-316-81780-5. OCLC 1028872325 – via Internet Archive.
- Tekulsky, Mathew (2015). The Art Of Butterfly Gardening: How To Make Your Backyard Into A Beautiful Home For Butterflies. New York: Skyhorse Publishing. ISBN 978-1-336-28566-8. OCLC 906132918 – via Google Books.
- Warren, E.J.M. (1988). The Country Diary Book Of Creating A Butterfly Garden (1st American ed.). New York: Henry Holt and Company. ISBN 0-8050-0814-4. LCCN 87083030. OCLC 1193384885 – via Internet Archive.
- Xerces Society; Smithsonian Institution (1998). Butterfly Gardening: Creating Summer Magic In Your Garden. San Francisco: Sierra Club Books. ISBN 0-87156-975-2. LCCN 90030362. OCLC 763003507 – via Internet Archive.

== See also ==
- Butterfly house (conservatory)
- Category: Lists of butterflies
- Wildlife garden
