= Yellow coneflower =

Yellow coneflower is a common name for several plants and may refer to:

- Echinacea paradoxa, native to southern Missouri, Arkansas, and south-central Oklahoma in the United States
- Rudbeckia hirta (black-eyed Susan), native to eastern and central North America
- Ratibida pinnata, native to the central and eastern United States and Ontario
