= Digdaga Plain =

Fertile plain in the United Arab Emirates

Coordinates: 25.68°N 55.98°E

Digdaga Plains is a large fertile sand/gravel plain in northern United Arab Emirates (UAE). It is the biggest and most fertile plain.

Digdaga is in Fujairah. To the southwest is a sand desert and to the west are mountains. The landscape used to be a savannah with Prosopis cineraria trees and Calotropis, but this has mostly been replaced with cultivation. There is also birdlife here. To the south of it is Kalba. There is a Vegetable Market for produce.

There is some confusion that Digdaga Plains are in Ras Al Khaimah or Fujairah. It is clearly in Fujairah. Some textbooks and maps have marked it incorrectly. The UAE Government had officially announced in 2013 that it is situated in Fujairah to clear the confusion. In the new edition of textbooks and maps it will be marked correctly.
