= Acalolepta nivosa =

Scientific classification
- Domain: Eukaryota
- Kingdom: Animalia
- Phylum: Arthropoda
- Class: Insecta
- Order: Coleoptera
- Suborder: Polyphaga
- Infraorder: Cucujiformia
- Family: Cerambycidae
- Tribe: Lamiini
- Genus: Acalolepta
- Species: A. nivosa

Binomial name
- Acalolepta nivosa (White, 1858)

Synonyms
- Dihammus nivosus (White, 1858); Monochamus nivosus White, 1858; Monohammus nivosus (White, 1858)

Species of beetle

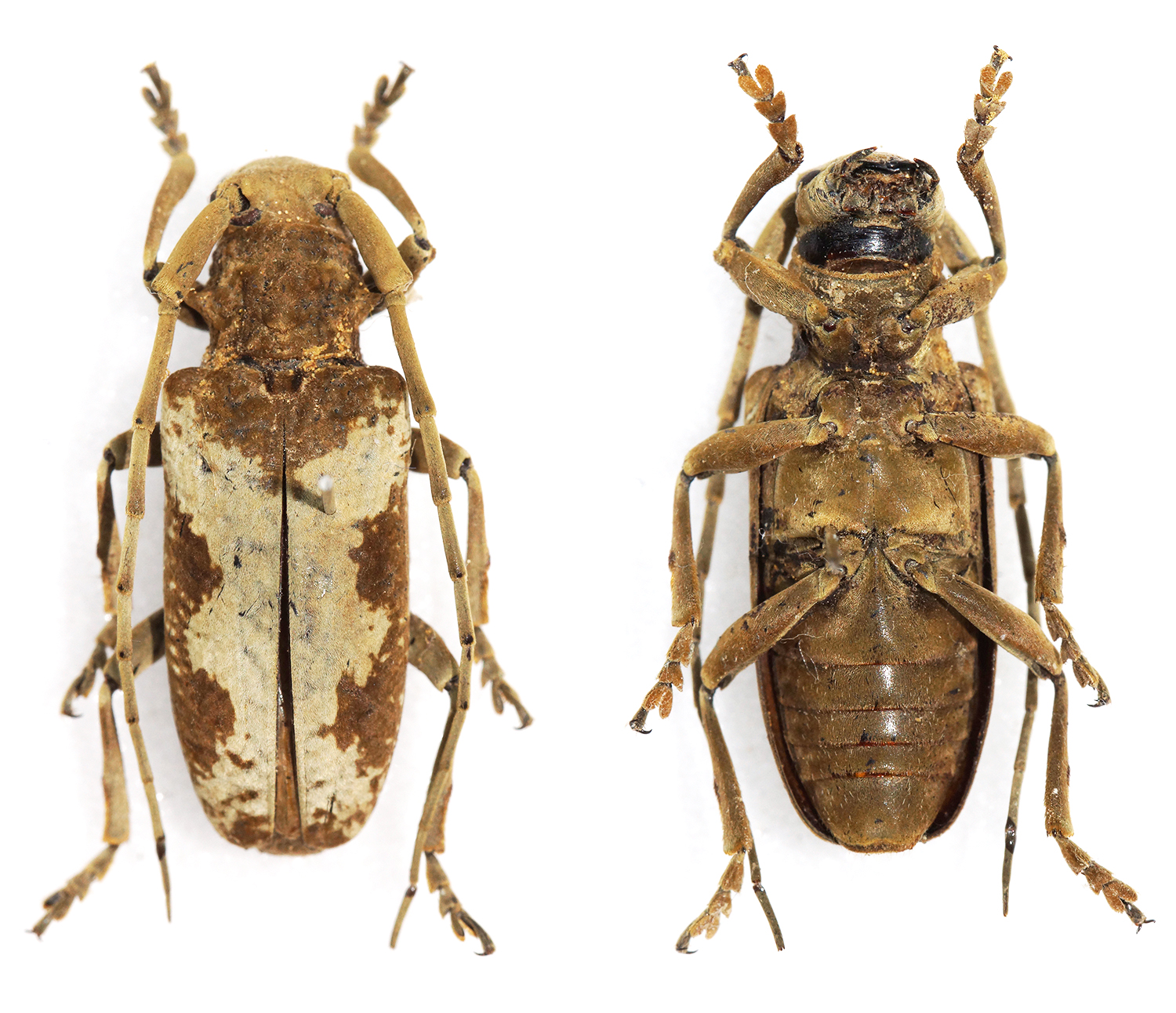

Acalolepta nivosa is a species of beetle in the family Cerambycidae. It was described by Adam White in 1858. It is known from India, Sri Lanka, Nepal, and Myanmar. It feeds on Calotropis gigantea.
