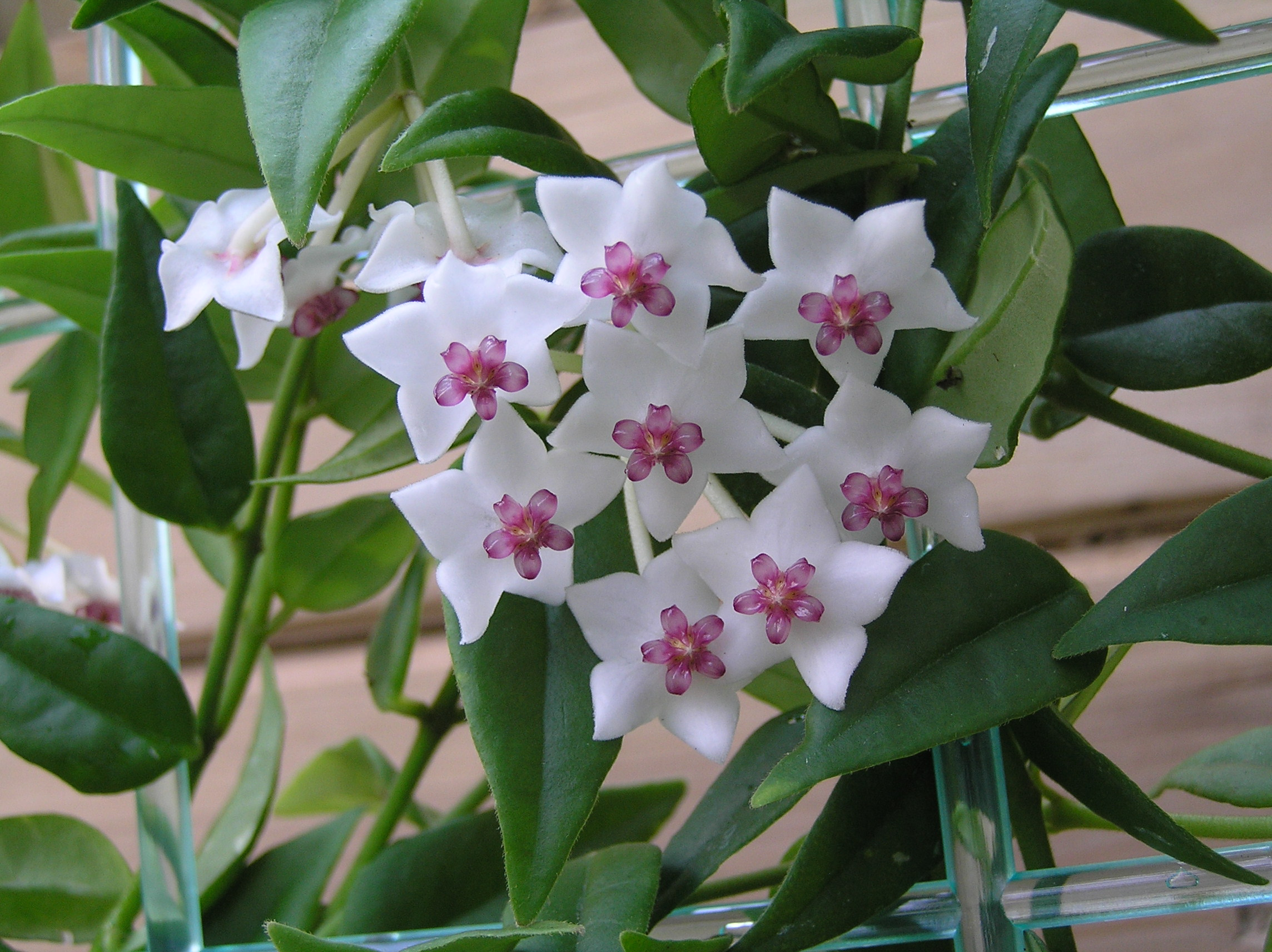

Scientific classification
- Kingdom: Plantae
- Clade: Tracheophytes
- Clade: Angiosperms
- Clade: Eudicots
- Clade: Asterids
- Order: Gentianales
- Family: Apocynaceae
- Genus: Hoya
- Species: H. bella

Binomial name
- Hoya bella Hook. (1848)

Synonyms
- Synonymy: Hoya lanceolata subsp. bella (Hook.) D.H.Kent; Hoya paxtonii G.Nicholson

= Hoya bella =

Species of flowering plant

Hoya bella, the beautiful hoya, waxflower or pretty waxflower, is a species of tropical epiphyte with trailing stems, slightly succulent leaves and pendant umbels of fragrant, white and purple flowers. It is an asclepiad in the periwinkle and milkweed family, Apocynaceae.

== Range ==
The Cornish plant collector Thomas Lobb found plants of Hoya bella growing on trees on a hill near Moulmein, then the capital of British Burma. Lobb shipped the live plants to his employers, Messrs. Veitch and Son of Exeter. Kew Gardens consider that the plant is also native to Manipur in northeast India on the border of Myanmar.

== Uses ==
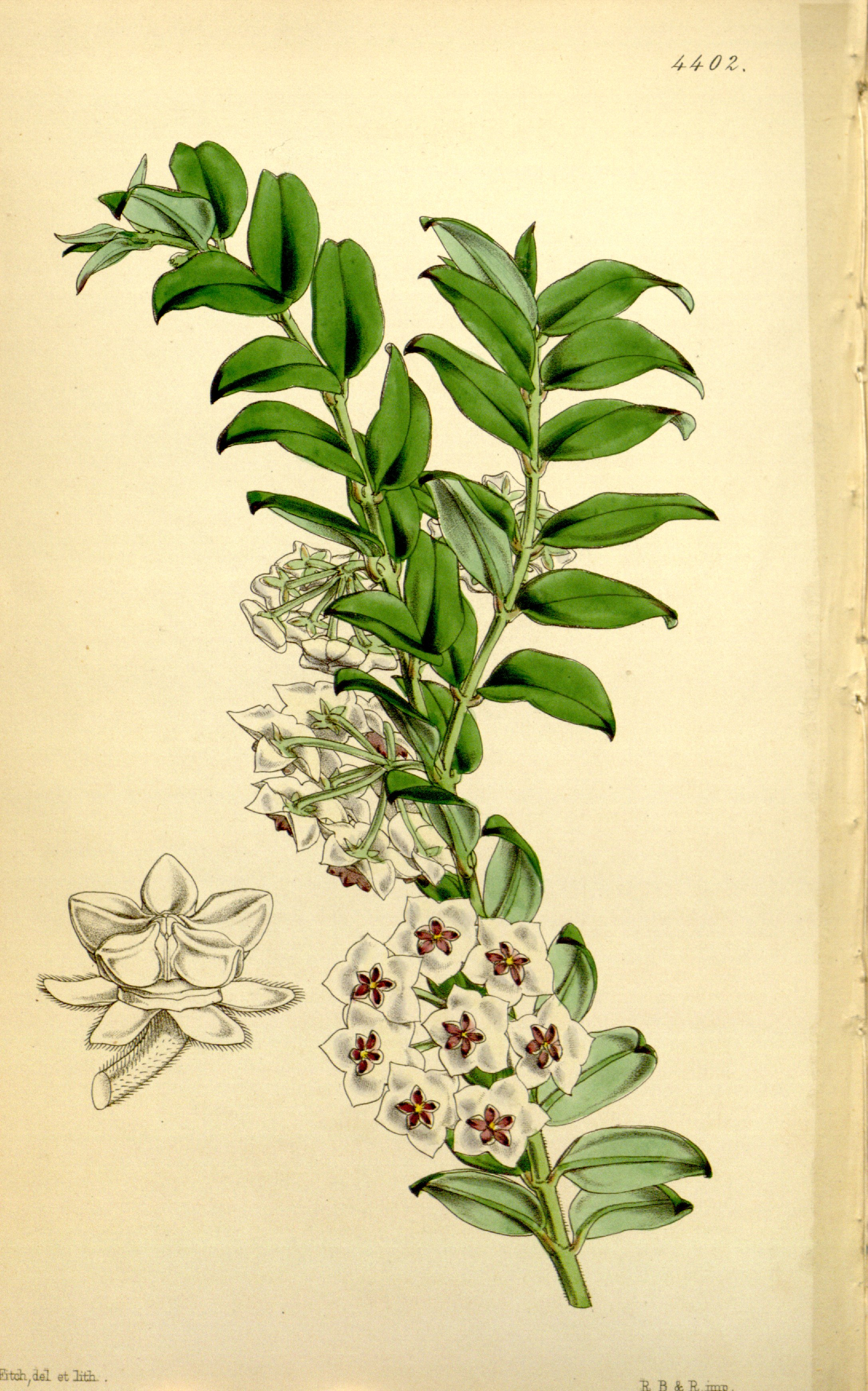
Curtis's Botanical Magazine (1848) Illustration by Walter Hood Fitch

Hoya bella was described and pictured in Curtis's Botanical Magazine in 1848. Part of that description included: "The most lovely of all the Hoyas, to which a figure (as in the case of most flowers with much white) is little calculated to do justice. It cannot be called a climber, but the branches are diffuse, copiously leafy, so that the leaves (unlike those in H. carnosa) form a dark back-ground to the delicate umbels of flowers, with leaves in shape resembling those of a Myrtle, and flowers more lively and differently-formed from those of Hoya carnosa, and most deliciously scented. The corolla is a purer white, and the corona a deeper purple: resembling an amethyst set in frosted silver."

By August 1849, Messrs. Veitch and Son were advertising "well-grown plants" for 63 shillings. They offered one free with the purchase of three plants.

As the plant grows easily from cuttings, the price came down quickly. On the 24th of October 1850, Thomas Appleby (Floricultural Manager of Messrs Henderson, Edgeware-road in London) wrote that "The price for tolerable good plants is 7s. 6d.". He also wrote that "As the H. imperialis is one of the most noble of the noble plants, so this is the prettiest of all the pretty ones."

Hoya bella has been popular as an ornamental and fragrant flowering houseplant ever since. In 1993, Hoya bella (under the synonym Hoya lanceolata subsp. bella) was given the Royal Horticultural Society's Award of Garden Merit.
