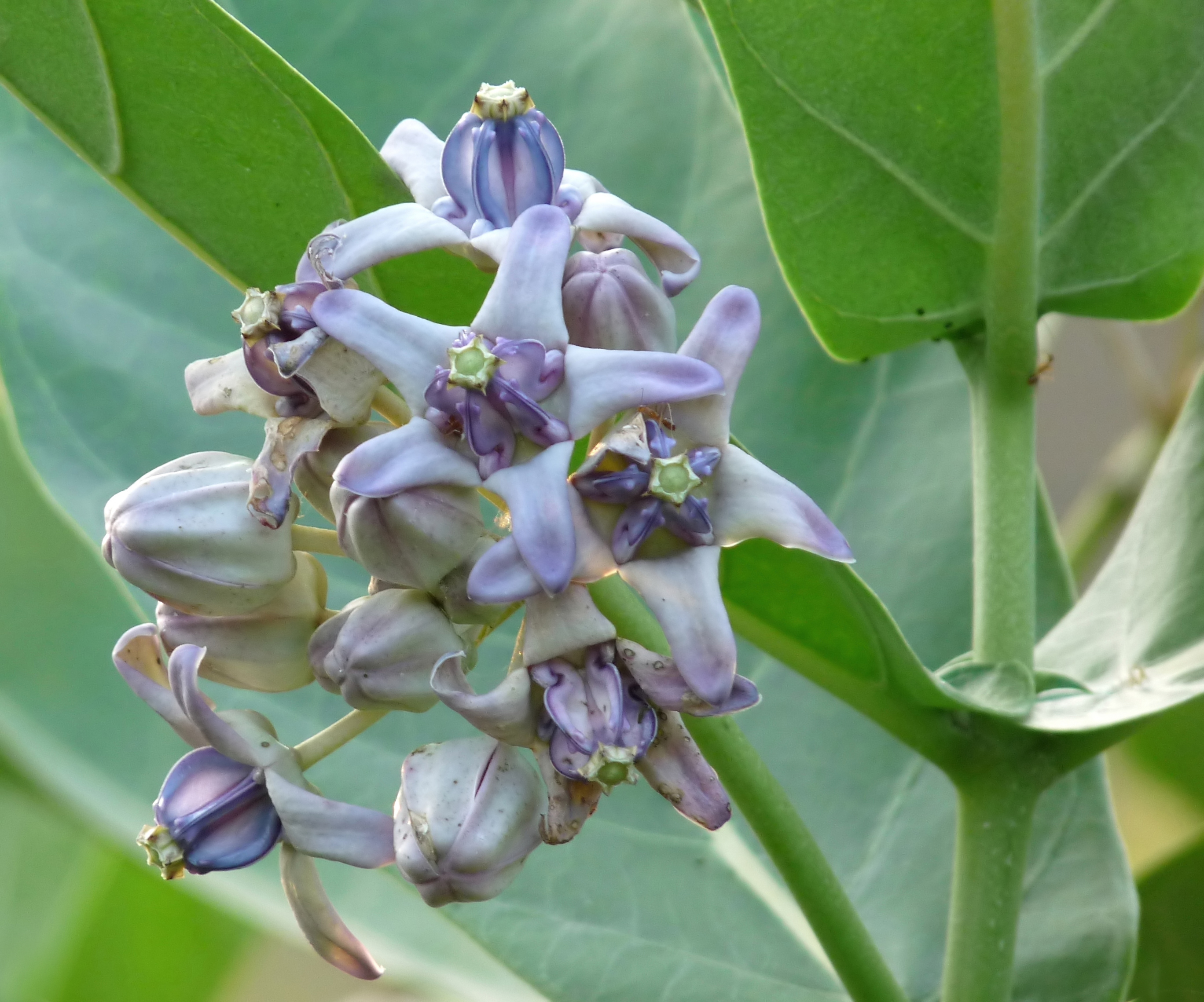

Scientific classification
- Kingdom: Plantae
- Clade: Tracheophytes
- Clade: Angiosperms
- Clade: Eudicots
- Clade: Asterids
- Order: Gentianales
- Family: Apocynaceae
- Genus: Calotropis
- Species: C. gigantea

Binomial name
- Calotropis gigantea (L.) Dryand.

Synonyms
- Asclepias gigantea L.; Calotropis gigantea (L.) R. Br. ex Schult.; Madorius giganteus (L.) Kuntze; Periploca cochinchinensis Lour.; Streptocaulon cochinchinense (Lour.) G. Don

= Calotropis gigantea =

Species of plant

Calotropis gigantea, the crown flower, is a species of Calotropis native to India, Cambodia, Vietnam, Bangladesh, Indonesia, Malaysia, Philippines, Thailand, Sri Lanka, China, Pakistan, and Nepal.

== Description ==
It is a large shrub growing to 4 m (13 ft) tall. It has clusters of waxy flowers that are either white or lavender in colour. Each flower consists of five pointed petals and a small "crown" rising from the center which holds the stamens. The aestivation found in calotropis is valvate i.e. sepals or petals in a whorl just touch one another at the margin, without overlapping. The plant has oval, light green leaves and milky stem. The latex of Calotropis gigantea contains cardiac glycosides, fatty acids, and calcium oxalate. The roots also contain Calotropone.

- Stem : Erect, branched, cylindrical, solid, contains milky latex.
- Leaves : 100–200 mm (4–8 in) long, decussate, obovate or elliptic-oblong, shortly acute, subsessile, cordate or often amplexicaul at the base.
- Inflorescence : Umbellate cymes.
- Flowers : Large, white, not scented, peduncles arising between the petioles. Flower-buds ovoid, angled, Calyx lobes 5, divided to the base, white, ovate; corolla broadly rotate, valvate, lobes 5, deltoid ovate, reflexed, coronate-appendages broad, obtusely 2-auricled below the rounded apex which is lower than the staminal-column.
- Stamen : 5, anthers short with membranous appendages, inflexed over the depressed apex of the pentagonal stigma. Pollinium one in each cell, pendulous caudicles slender.
- Carpel : 2 distinct, styles 2, united to the single pentangular stigma, ovary 2-celled, ovules many.
- Fruit : A pair of follicles with many, hairy seeds which are dispersed by wind.
- Flowering and Fruiting Time : November–April
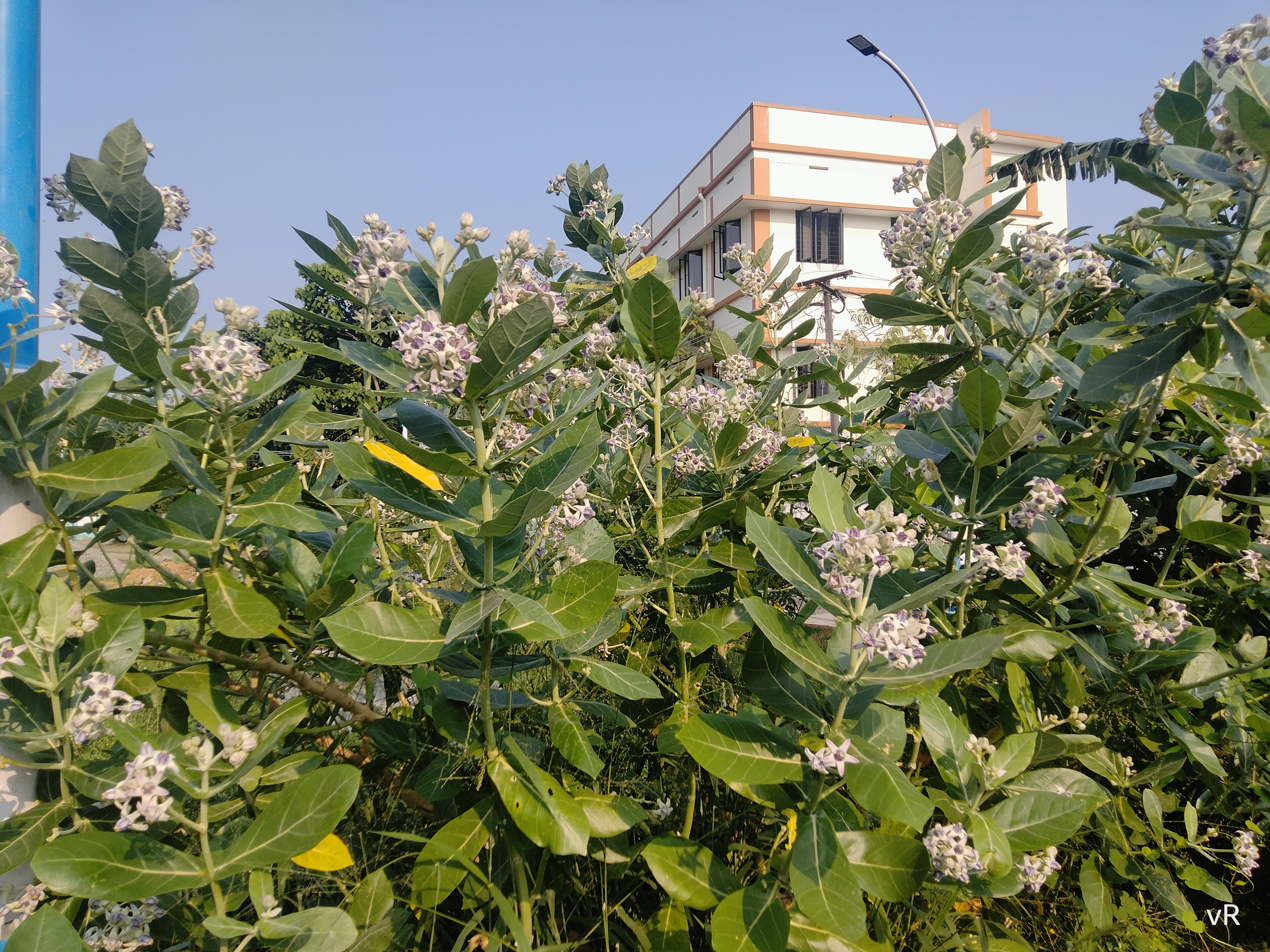
Plant

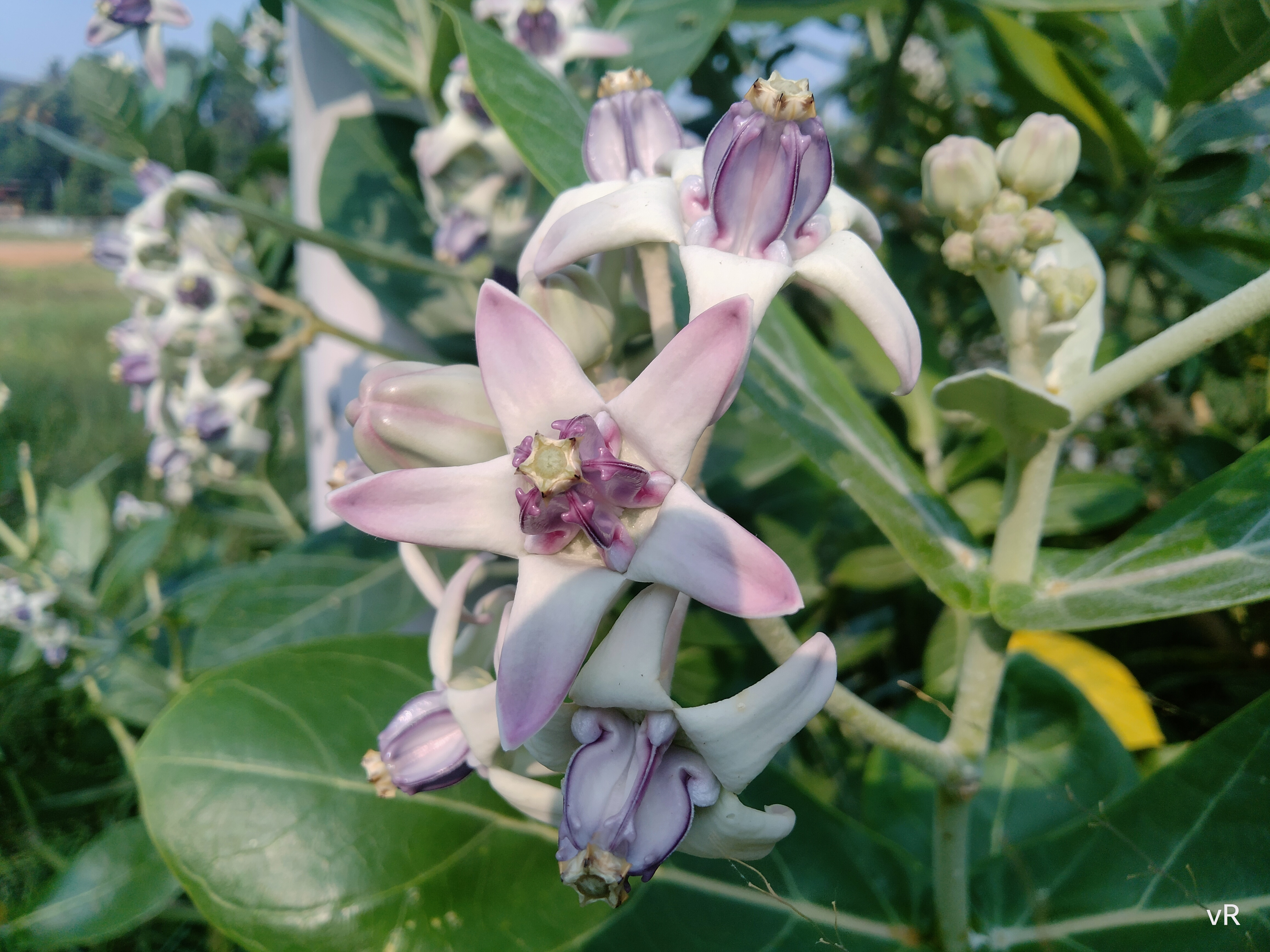
Flower

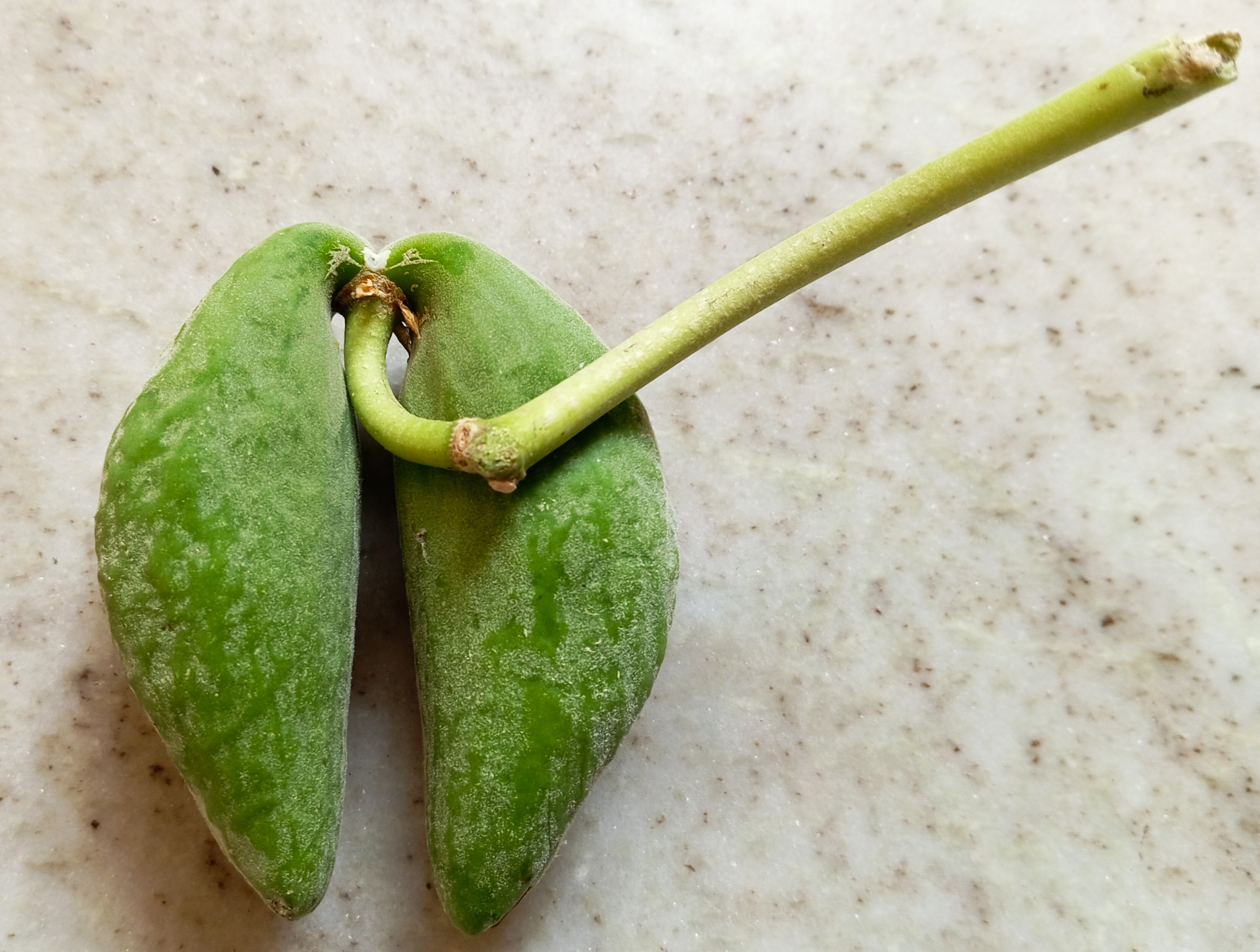
Fruit

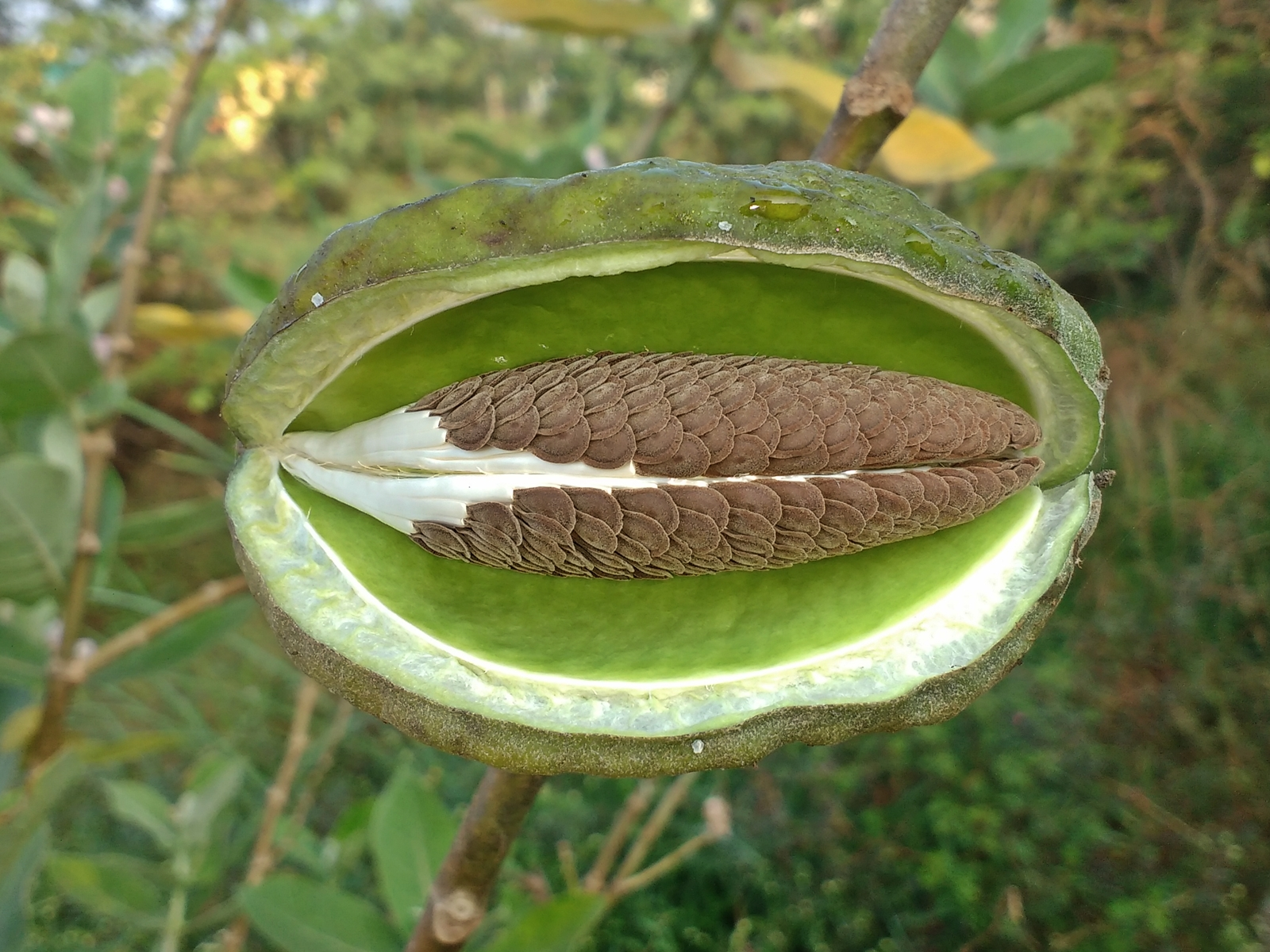
Seeds

=== Pollination ===
This plant plays host to a variety of insects and butterflies. It is the host plant for Hawaii's non-migratory monarch butterflies. Calotropis is an example of entomophily pollination (pollination by insects) and pollination is achieved with the help of bees. In Calotropis, gynostegium is present (formed by the fusion of stigma and androecium). The pollen are in a structure named pollinia which is attached to a glandular, adhesive disc at the stigmatic angle (translator mechanism). These sticky discs get attached to the legs of visiting bees that pull out pollinia when a bee moves away. When such a bee visits another flower, this flower might be pollinated by the pollinium.

=== Names ===
Calotropis gigantea is known by various names across Indian languages and holds importance in traditional systems like Ayurveda and Siddha. In Bahasa Indonesia, its flowers are called widuri.

| Language | Name | Script |
|---|---|---|
| Bengali | Akondo | আকন্দ |
| Hindi | Ak / Madar | आक / मदार |
| Kannada | Ekka | ಎಕ್ಕ |
| Malayalam | Erikku | എരിക് |
| Marathi | Ruii | रुई |
| Nepali | Aank | आँक |
| Sanskrit | Arka | अर्क |
| Tamil | Erukku | எருக்கு |
| Telugu | Jilledu | జిల్లేడు |

== Uses ==
The flowers are long lasting, and in Thailand they are used in floral arrangements. The extract of flowers and leaves has shown hypoglycemic effect in preclinical studies. They were favored by the Hawaiian Queen Liliuokalani, who considered them a symbol of royalty and wore them strung into leis. In Cambodia, they are used in funerals to decorate the urn or sarcophagus and the interior of the house holding the funeral.

In Hindu mythology, according to the Shiva Purana, the madar flower/crown flower is very much liked by Lord Shiva; therefore the crown flower and its garland are offered to Lord Shiva for peace, prosperity and stability in society. The Crown flower is also one of the major parts of the nine astrological trees (Navagrah tree).

Calotropis yields a durable fiber (commercially known as bowstring of India) useful for ropes, carpets, fishing nets, and sewing thread. Floss, obtained from seeds, is used as stuffing. Crown flower cotton can also be used to make a pillow. A fermented mixture of Calotropis and salt is used to remove the hair from goat skins for production of nari leather and from sheep skins to make leather which is much used for inexpensive book binding. Fungicidal and insecticidal properties of Calotropis have been reported, with some preparations found to be more effective than ointment. In India, the plant is common in the compounds of temples and is known as madar in Hindi: मदार. Its leaf (Marathi: rui) is one of the five leaves used in the Panch Pallava, a ritual assortment of five different leaves used as a totem by the Maratha culture in India.

=== Allelopathic effects ===
Allelopathic effects of Calotropis on different agricultural crops have been well studied. Extracts of plant parts such as root, stem, and leaf affect germination and seedling vigor of many agricultural crops. However, extracts of Calotropis failed to produce any detrimental effects on weeds such as Chenopodium album, Melilotus alba, Melilotus indica, Sphaeranthus indicus, and Phalaris minor.

=== Use as an arrow poison ===
Many plant and animal extracts have been used as arrow poisons all over the world. In many cases, the poison was applied to the arrow or spear to aid the hunting of prey. Alkaloids are among the most powerful plant poisons, and extracts of Strychnos species are commonly used. Other arrow poisons are commonly cardiac glycosides, which can be found in digitalis, but most of these arrow poisons are derived from plants in the family Apocynaceae. This family includes Calotropis gigantea and the more potent Calotropis procera. The latex of these plants has been used in Africa as an arrow poison. Apocynaceae species often contain a mixture of cardiac glycosides, including calactin, uscharin, calotoxin, and calotropin. These poisons work by inhibiting the sodium-potassium pump, and this effect is especially potent in the cardiac tissues. The cardiac effects can be applied for heart medication, and digitalis has been used as such. However, excessive doses can cause arrhythmia, which can lead to death.

=== Medical uses ===
Given the potent bioactivity of calotropin, calotropis gigantea has been used as a folk medicine in India for many years, and has been reported to have a variety of uses. In Ayurveda, Indian practitioners have used the root and leaf of C. procera in asthma and also used in bacterial infection, swelling with redness, boils also and shortness of breath and the bark in liver and spleen diseases. The plant is reported as effective in treating skin, digestive, respiratory, circulatory and neurological disorders and was used to treat fevers, elephantiasis, nausea, vomiting, and diarrhea. The milky juice of Calotropis procera was used against arthritis, cancer, and as an antidote for snake bite. However, these reports are of folk uses and more research is needed to confirm the clinical usefulness of the leaves, latex, and bark. Recent studies have displayed use of calotropin as a contraceptive and as a potential cancer medication. In one study of the cancer-fighting properties of Calotropis gigantea, DCM extracts were demonstrated to be strongly cytotoxic against non-small cell lung carcinoma (A549), colon carcinoma (HCT 116), and hepatocellular carcinoma in hamsters (Hep G2). These extracts show potential as cancer medications and warrant further clinical research.

=== Anti-mosquito properties ===
C. gigantea is reported to exhibit mosquito controlling properties against Culex gelidus and Culex tritaeniorhynchus mosquitoes which serve as vectors for Japanese encephalitis. The aqueous extract of the C. gigantea leaves demonstrated significant larvicidal, repellent and ovicidal activity.

== Poisoning ==
Calotropis is a poisonous plant. The active principles are uscharin, calotoxin, calactin, and calotropin. The leaves and stem when incised yield thick milky juice. It is used as an arrow poison, cattle poison (see also Sutari), rarely for suicide and homicide and mostly an accidental poison.

The milky latex sap of Calotropis gigantea is a known cause of toxic keratoconjunctivitis and reversible vision loss. Crown flower keratitis is a rare condition and is usually the result of accidental ocular exposure to the sap. During the process of making a Hawaiian lei flower necklace, touching the sap and then touching the ocular surface may result in crown flower keratitis. Damage (poisoning) of the cornea endothelium results in corneal stromal edema and decreased visual acuity. Although there is some permanent damage to the corneal endothelium with decreased endothelial cell count and irregular shape, the remaining corneal endothelial cells usually recover with complete resolution of the corneal edema and a return to normal visual acuity. The condition is usually self-limited and resolves faster with topical steroids. The clinical course of this condition suggests that Calotropis is paradoxically relatively nontoxic to corneal epithelium and highly toxic to corneal endothelium. The painless clinical course may be related to anesthetic properties of Calotropis latex and relatively minor epithelial injury.

=== Signs and symptoms ===
Applied to the skin, it causes redness and vesication. When taken orally, the juice produces an acrid, bitter taste and burning pain in throat and stomach, salivation, stomatitis, vomiting, diarrhea, dilated pupils, tetanic convulsions, collapse and death. The fatal period is 6 to 12 hours. Treatment includes stomach wash, demulcents, and symptomatic treatment.
