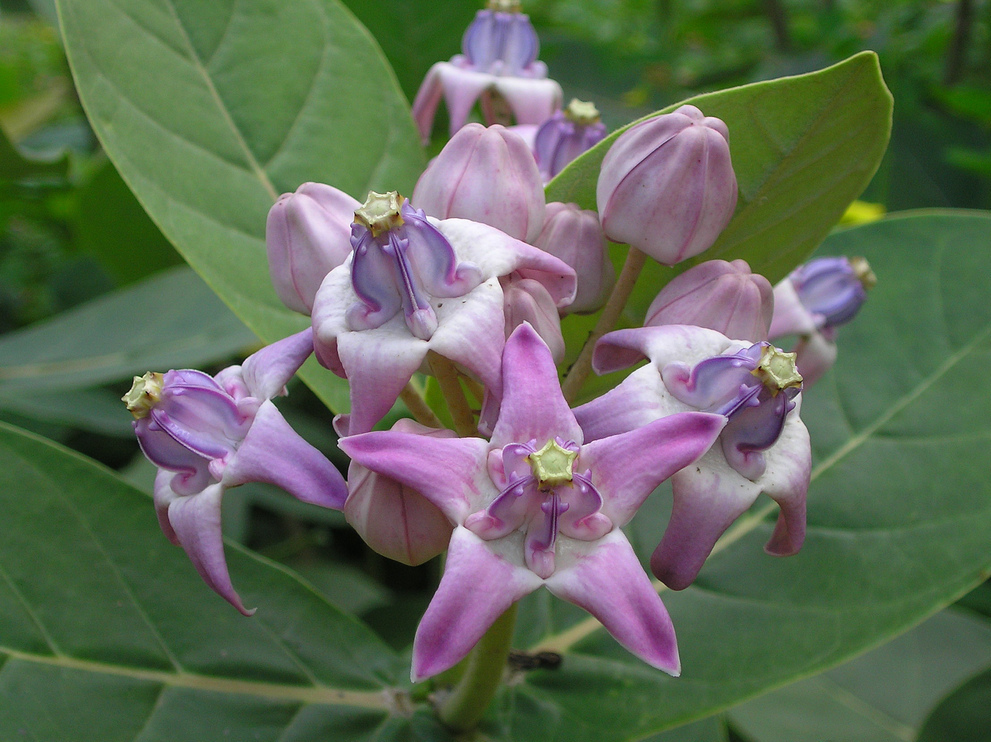
- Calotropis gigantea

Scientific classification
- Kingdom: Plantae
- Clade: Tracheophytes
- Clade: Angiosperms
- Clade: Eudicots
- Clade: Asterids
- Order: Gentianales
- Family: Apocynaceae
- Subfamily: Asclepiadoideae
- Tribe: Asclepiadeae
- Genus: Calotropis; R.Br.

= Calotropis =

Genus of flowering plants

Calotropis is a genus of flowering plants in the family Apocynaceae, first described as a genus in 1810. It is native to southern Asia and North Africa.

They are commonly known as milkweeds because of the latex they produce. Calotropis species are considered common weeds in some parts of the world. The flowers are fragrant and are often used in making floral tassels in some mainland Southeast Asian cultures. Fibers of these plants are called mudar or mader. The flowers of the plant are offered to the Hindu deities Shiva, Ganesha, Shani Dev and Hanuman. Calotropis species are usually found in abandoned farmland.

== Description ==
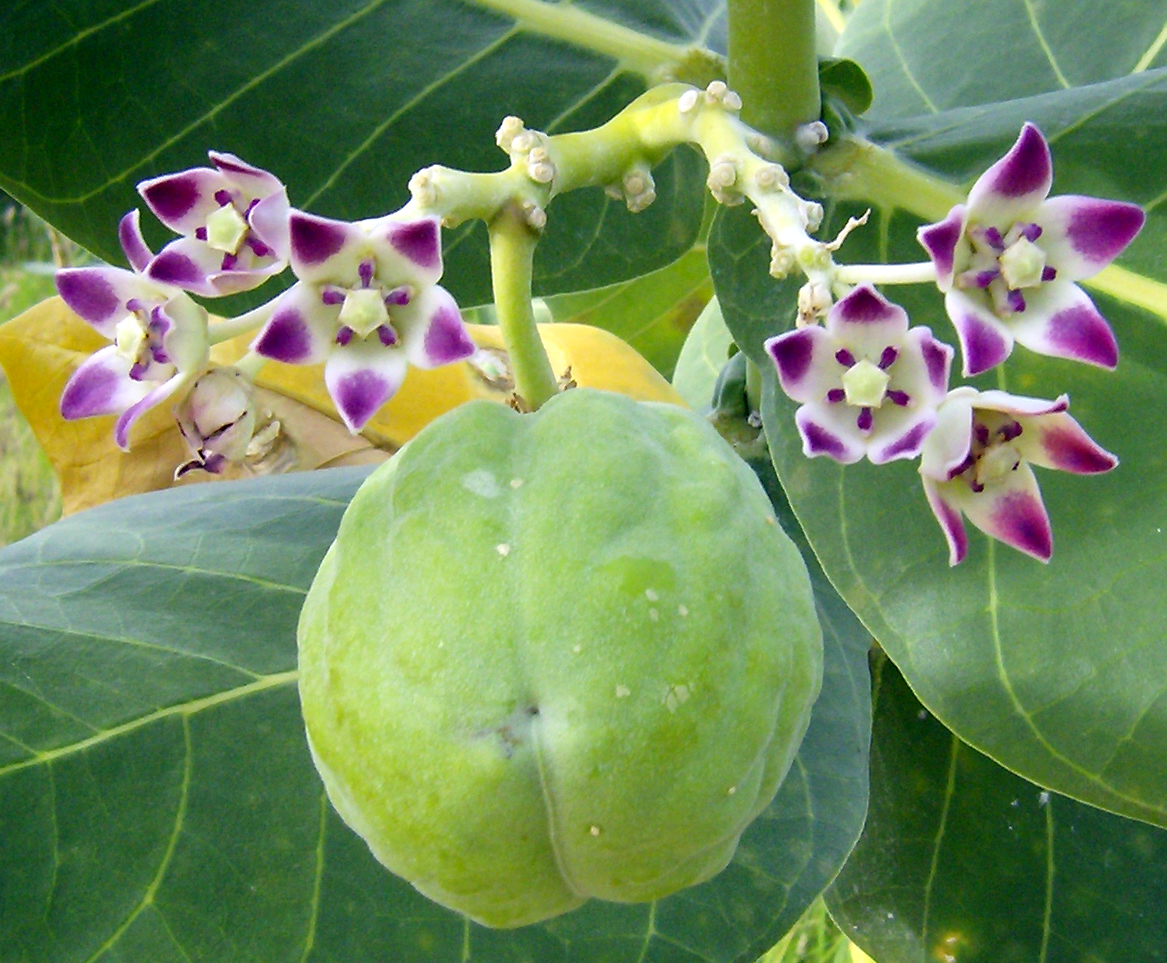
Calotropis procera flowers and fruit

Calotropis gigantea and C. procera are the two most common species in the genus. Both plants can attain an average height of 8 to 10 ft (2.4 to 3.0 m) although they can occasionally become as tall as 14 to 16 ft (4.3 to 4.9 m). The leaves are sessile and sub-sessile, opposite, ovate, cordate at the base. The flowers are about 1.5 to 2 in (3.8 to 5.1 cm) in size, with umbellate lateral cymes and are colored white to pink and are fragrant in case of C. procera while the flowers of C. gigantea are without any fragrance and are white to purple colored, but in rarer cases are also light green-yellow or white. The seeds are compressed, broadly ovoid, with a tufted micropylar coma of long silky hair.

Pollination is performed by bees (entomophily) by the following mechanism:

The stigmas and androecia are fused to form a gynostegium. The pollen are enclosed in pollinia (a coherent mass of pollen grains). The pollinia are attached to an adhesive glandular disc at the stigmatic angle. When a bee lands on one of these, the disc adheres to its legs, and the pollinium is detached from the flower when the bee flies away. When the bee visits another flower, the flower is pollinated by the adhering pollinium on the bee.

Species

1. Calotropis acia Buch.-Ham. - India.
2. Calotropis gigantea (L.) Dryand. - China, Indian Subcontinent, Southeast Asia.
3. Calotropis procera (Aiton) Dryand. - China, Indian Subcontinent, Southeast Asia, Middle East, North Africa.

Formerly included

Calotropis sussuela, synonym of Hoya imperialis.

== Toxicity ==
The milky sap of Calotropis plants is a toxic substance that can cause irritation when it comes into contact with the skin or eyes. The sap can be collected from various parts of the plant, including the flowers, stem, and leaves. The sap is extremely bitter and turns into a gluey coating that is resistant to soap, therefore it has to be treated immediately once it has fallen into the eye.

Calotropis species are toxic plants; calotropin, a compound in the latex, is more toxic than strychnine. Calotropin is similar in structure to two cardiac glycosides which are responsible for the cytotoxicity of Apocynum cannabinum. Extracts from the flowers of Calotropis procera have shown strong cytotoxic activity. Cattle and other animals often stay away from the plants because of their unpleasant taste and their content of cardiac glycosides.

The toxic ingredients of Calotropis plants, including Calotropis procera, can be preserved in liquid form, and they naturally disintegrate over time. Calotropis leaves are used as fodder for animals once they are dried.

== Medicinal properties ==
Calotropis, a genus of plants that includes species such as Calotropis gigantea and Calotropis procera, has been traditionally used for its medicinal properties in various cultures. The following are some of the reported medicinal uses of Calotropis:

1. Anti-inflammatory: Calotropis extracts have been used traditionally to alleviate inflammation. The latex of the plant contains compounds that possess anti-inflammatory properties. Traditional uses of Calotropis include treating skin conditions such as eczema, psoriasis, and other inflammatory skin disorders. Its anti-inflammatory and wound-healing properties may contribute to these potential benefits.
2. Antimicrobial: Certain parts of Calotropis, especially the latex, have shown antimicrobial activity against various bacterial and fungal pathogens. This property has been utilized in traditional medicine to treat skin infections and wounds. The antimicrobial activity of Calotropis plants has been attributed to the presence of various bioactive compounds such as alkaloids, flavonoids, and terpenoids. A study found that the latex of Calotropis procera has significant antimicrobial activity against various bacterial and fungal pathogens, including Staphylococcus aureus, Escherichia coli, and Candida albicans
3. Wound Healing: The latex of Calotropis has been used topically to promote wound healing. It is believed to help in the formation of granulation tissue and facilitate the healing process.
4. Analgesic (Pain Relief): Some traditional practices involve using Calotropis preparations to relieve pain and discomfort.
5. Gastrointestinal Disorders: Some traditional medicinal practices use Calotropis to alleviate gastrointestinal issues such as constipation and dysentery. However, its laxative effects are strong and can lead to adverse effects.
6. Anti-parasitic: Calotropis extracts have been used in traditional medicine to treat parasitic infections. Some compounds in the plant have demonstrated activity against certain parasites.

Calotropis contains toxic compounds, especially in its latex. If using Calotropis for its potential medicinal properties, it's best to consult a qualified healthcare professional who can provide guidance based on your specific health needs and conditions first.

== Gallery ==
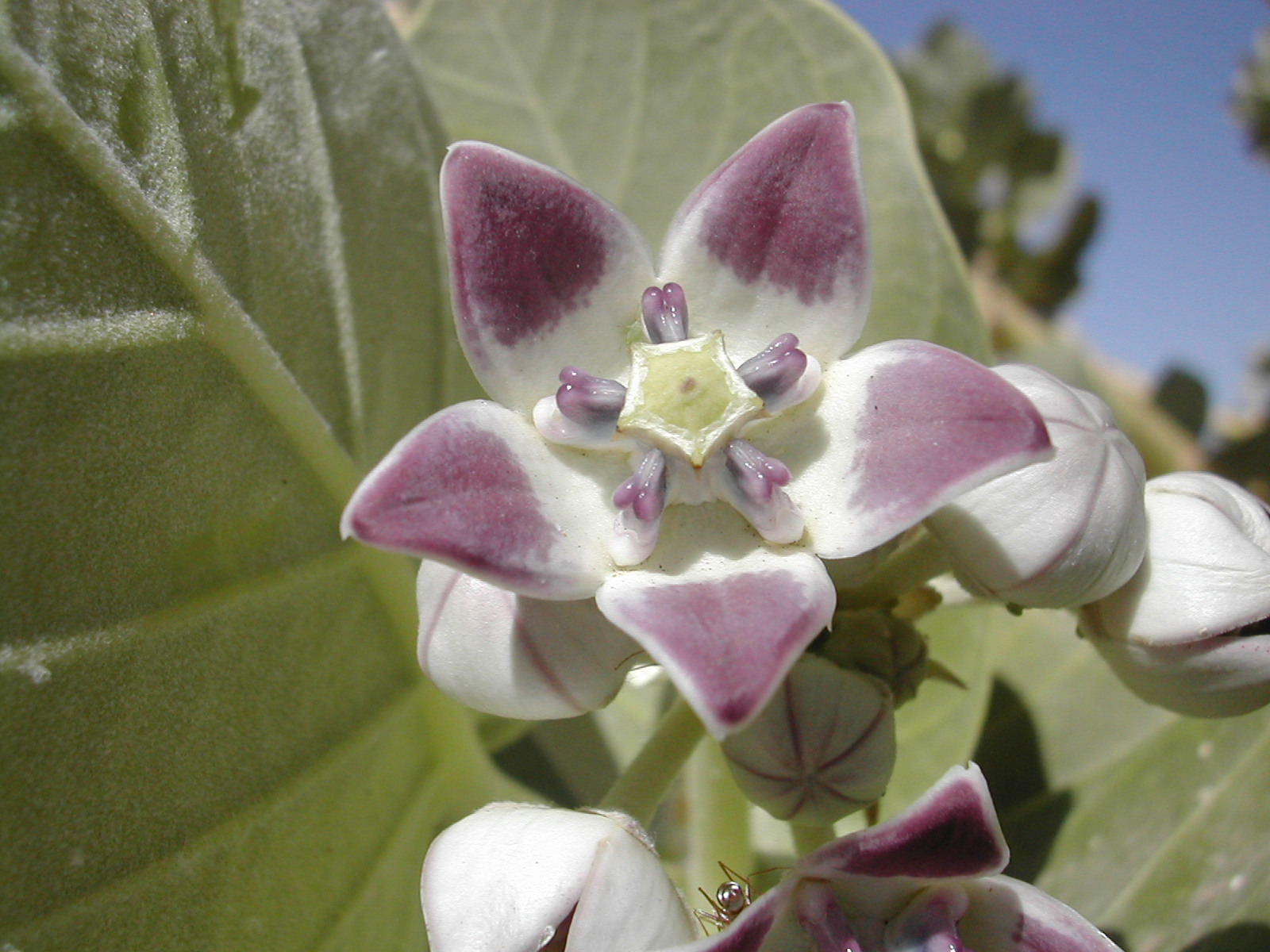
Calotropis procera flower

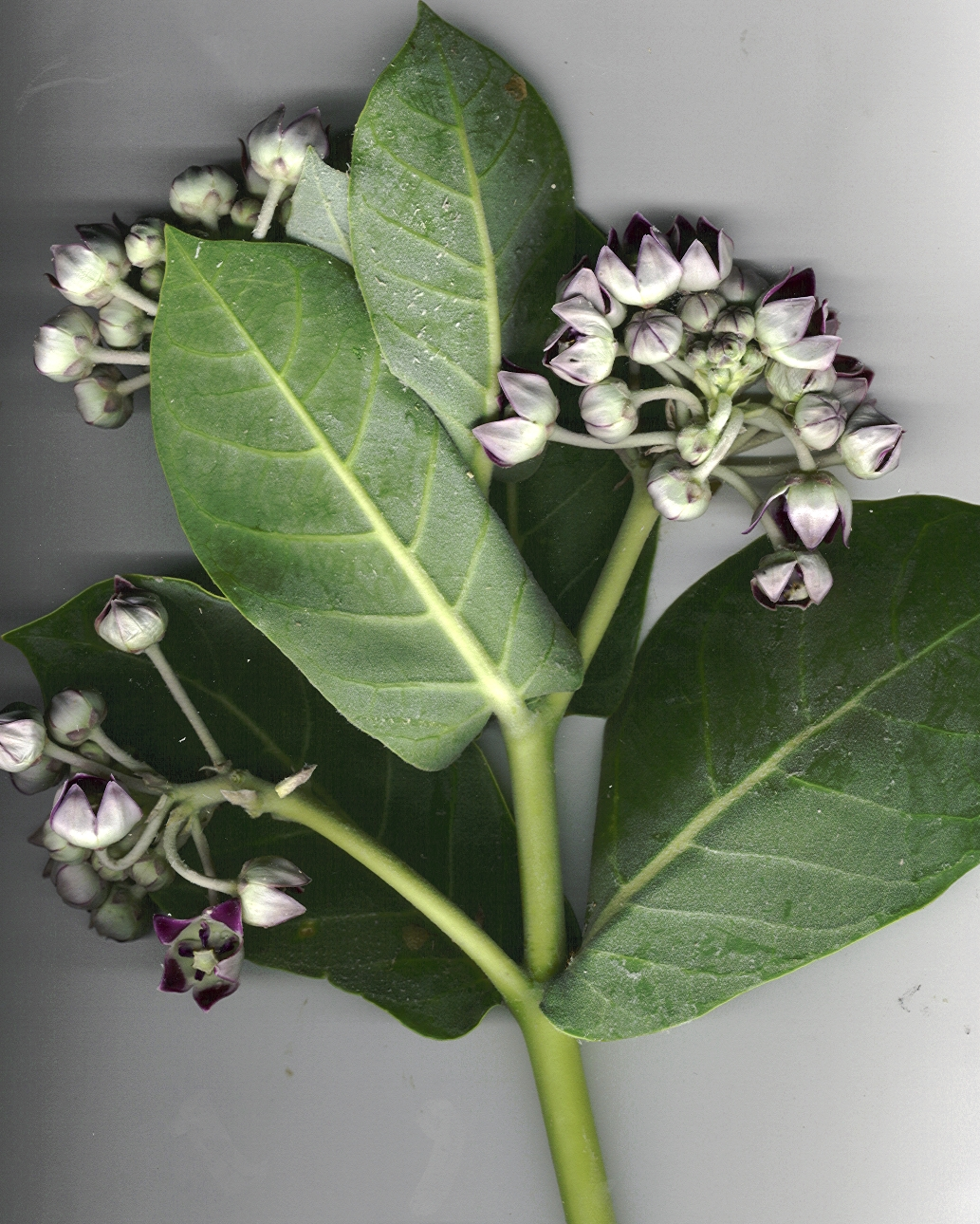
Calotropis procera branch with flowers

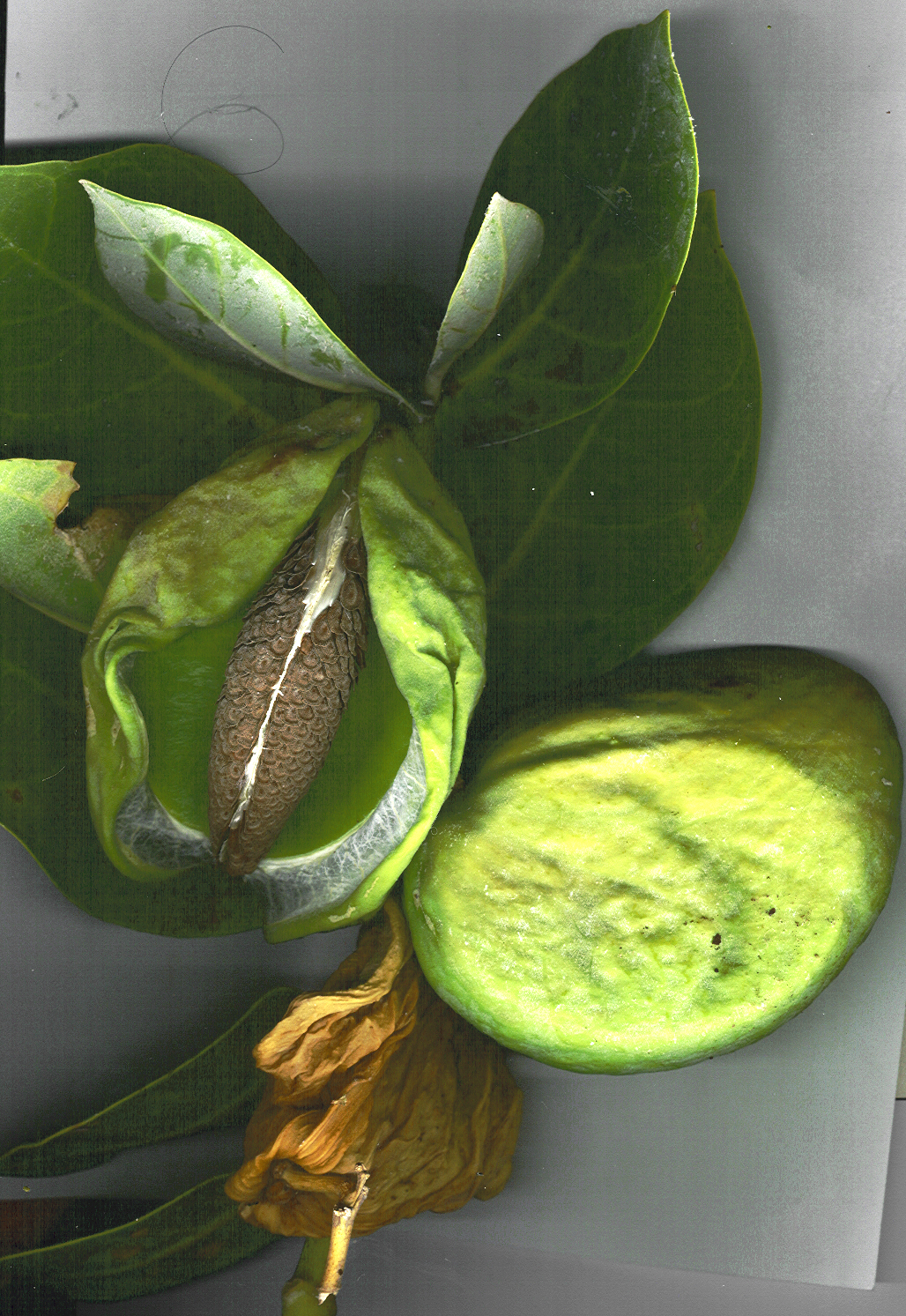
Calotropis procera fruit

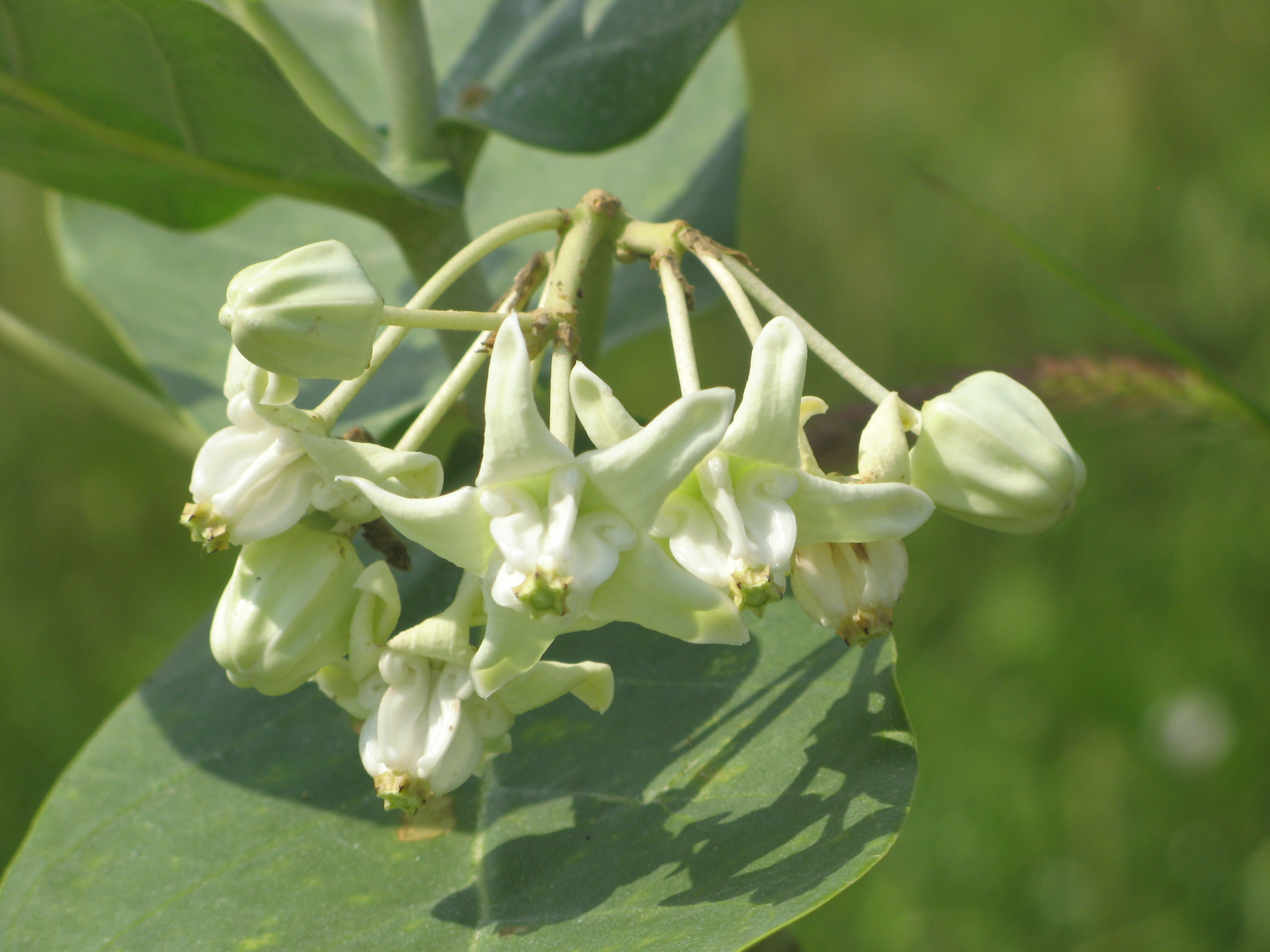
Calotropis gigantea flowers

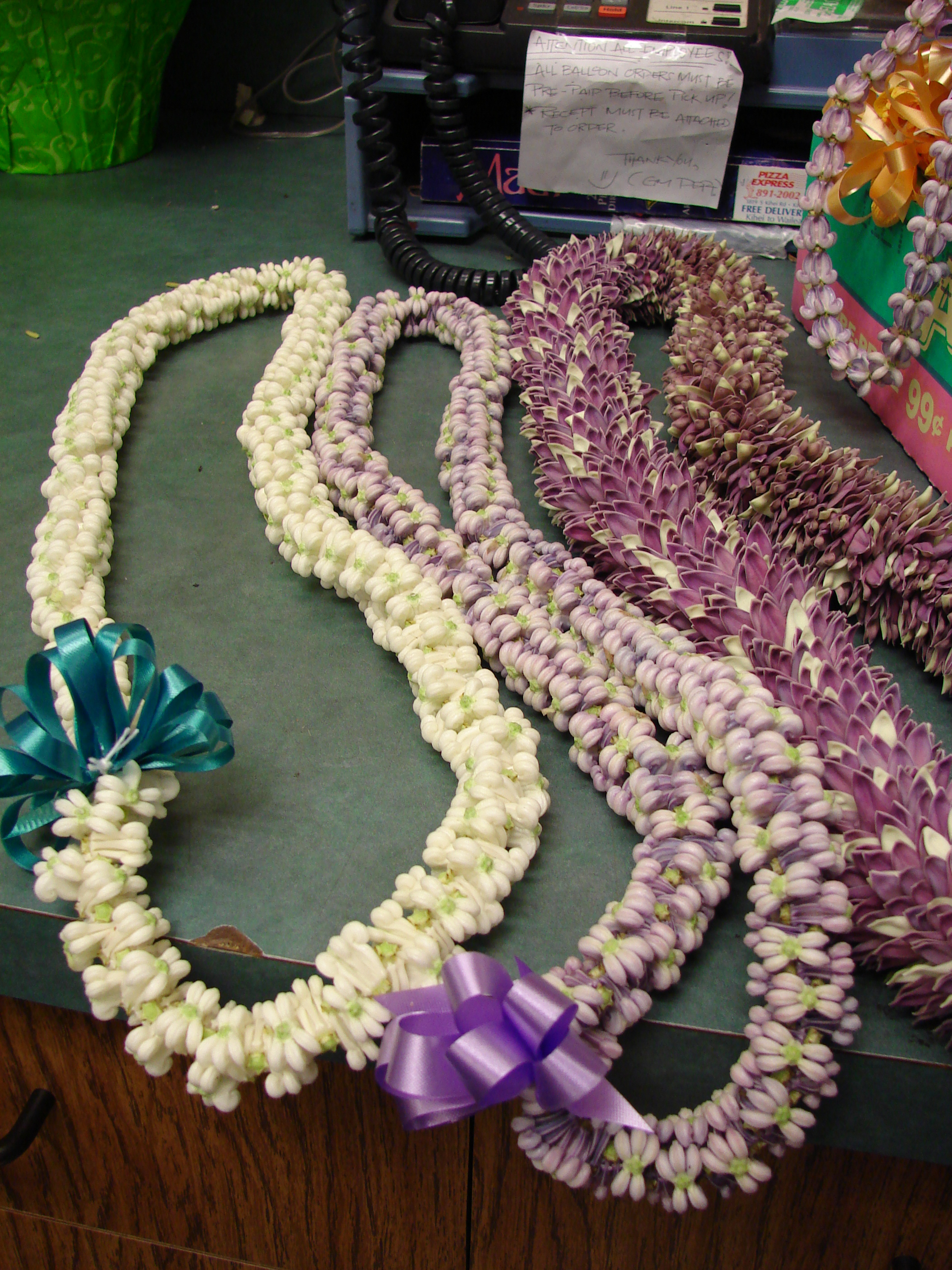
Floral tassels made from Calotropis flowers
