= Calotropin =

Names
- Systematic IUPAC name (1R,3aS,3bR,5aS,6aR,7aS,9R,11S,11aS,12aR,13aR,13bS,15aR)-3a,11,11a-Trihydroxy-9,15a-dimethyl-1-(5-oxo-2,5-dihydrofuran-3-yl)icosahydro-9H,13aH-cyclopenta[7,8]phenanthro[2,3-b]pyrano[3,2-e][1,4]dioxine-13-carbaldehyde
- Other names Pecilocerin A, Pekilocerin A

Identifiers
CAS Number	1986-70-5
3D model (JSmol)	Interactive image
ChEBI	CHEBI:3329
ChEMBL	ChEMBL495949
ChemSpider	15326
KEGG	C08855
PubChem CID	16142
UNII	3XK21U1BZS
CompTox Dashboard (EPA)	DTXSID10173613
- InChI: InChI=1S/C29H40O9/c1-15-9-23(31)29(34)25(36-15)37-21-11-17-3-4-20-19(27(17,14-30)12-22(21)38-29)5-7-26(2)18(6-8-28(20,26)33)16-10-24(32)35-13-16/h10,14-15,17-23,25,31,33-34H,3-9,11-13H2,1-2H3/t15-,17+,18-,19+,20-,21-,22-,23+,25+,26-,27-,28+,29+/m1/s1 Key: OWPWFVVPBYFKBG-NYVHBPEFSA-N
- SMILES: CC1CC(C2(C(O1)OC3CC4CCC5C(C4(CC3O2)C=O)CCC6(C5(CCC6C7=CC(=O)OC7)O)C)O)O

Properties
Chemical formula	C_{29}H_{40}O_{9}
Molar mass	532.630 g·mol^{−1}
Melting point	223 °C (433 °F; 496 K)

Hazards
- Lethal dose or concentration (LD, LC)
LD_{50} (median dose)	9800 μg/kg (mouse)
- Except where otherwise noted, data are given for materials in their standard state (at 25 °C [77 °F], 100 kPa). Infobox references

Calotropin is a toxic cardenolide found in plants in the family Asclepiadoideae. In extreme cases, calotropin poisoning can cause respiratory and cardiac failure. Accidental poisoning is common in livestock who have ingested milkweed. Calotropin is commonly stored as a defense mechanism by insects that eat milkweeds as their main food source.

== Chemistry ==
Calotropin is a toxic compound and is classified as a cardenolide-type cardiac glycoside. These molecules are related to steroids, and have a similar carbon backbone. Calotropin, like calactin, calotoxin, and uscharin, is based on calotropagenin, the precursor to these molecules. They have similar activity and are often found together in plants of the genus Calotropis.

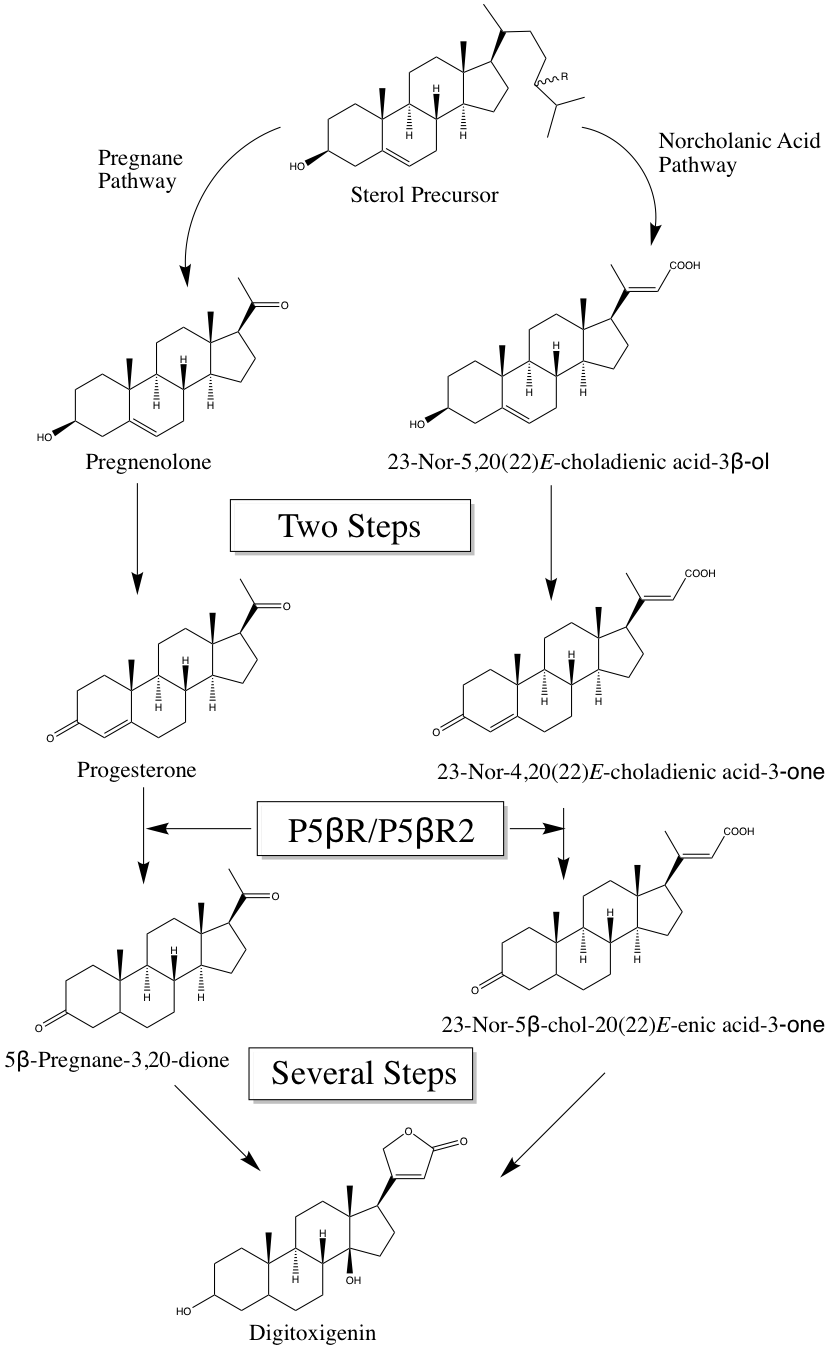
Biosynthesis of digitoxigenin

=== Biosynthesis ===
It is thought that the biosynthesis of calotropin is similar to that of digitoxin, another cardenolide. Digitoxin is more established as a medicine for cardiac insufficiency, and therefore the biosynthesis has been further studied. However, it is believed that many cardenolides are synthesized in plants by a similar process, but this process is not yet well understood. The sterol precursor for this process is similar to precursors for steroidal alkaloids. Two suggested pathways, the pregnane pathway and norcholanic acid pathway are possible for the conversion of the sterol precursor to digitoxigenin, the precursor to digitoxin. Both the pregnane and norcholanic acid pathways use progesterone 5β-reductases, the P5βR and P5βR2 respectively. In the pregnane pathway, a plant analog of the mitochondrial cytochrome P450 (CYP11A in humans), is thought to catalyze the conversion of pregnenolone to progesterone. Progesterone is further processed by P5βR to 5β-Pregnane-3,20-dione, and then to digitoxigenin. Less is known about the norcholanic acid pathway. At this point the similarities between digitoxin and calotropin end. Calotropagenin may be produced by the same process as digitoxigenin, however the mechanism for production of calotropin and digitoxin from these genins diverges. It is not well studied how calotropin is produced from its calotropagenin precursor.

== Toxicity ==
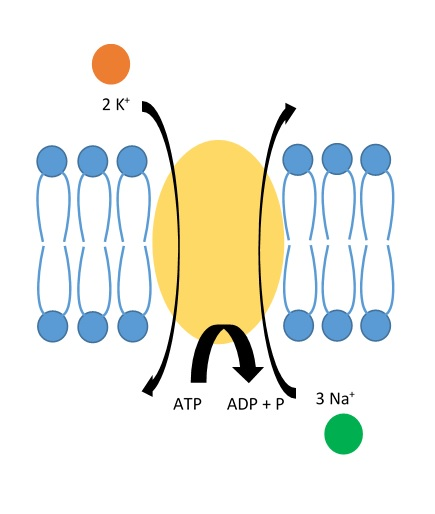
Sodium-potassium pump

=== Mechanism of action ===
Cardenolides such as calotropin inhibit the sodium-potassium pump, Na^{+}/K^{+}-ATPase. This enzyme is responsible for active transport of sodium and potassium ions across the cell membrane. This process also helps to regulate the resting potential and cell volume. Inhibition of this enzyme in cardiac tissue is proposed as the receptor for calotropin and cardiac glycosides in general, and this is responsible for the toxic effects. Inhibition of the Na^{+}/K^{+}-ATPase causes an increase of sodium inside the cell, and by the action of the sodium-calcium exchanger (NCX) also raises the calcium concentration. Calotropin has a more noticeable effect on the myocardium than it does on skeletal muscles, as these cells have more active NCX proteins. This can allow for higher cardiac output by the cardiac muscles, but can also lead to arrhythmia, which is aggravated by the charge buildup that develops when Na^{+}/K^{+}-ATPase is inhibited.

=== Symptoms and bioactivity ===
Poisoning can cause a variety of unpleasant symptoms including abdominal pain, bloating, diarrhoea, muscle tremors, seizures, and death. Death can be caused by hemorrhages in the lungs, respiratory failure, or cardiac failure. Symptoms can begin as early as two hours after ingestion, and may persist for hours or days. Ingestion is not always lethal, and plants in the genus Calotropis have long been used as a folk remedy in India.

== Natural sources ==
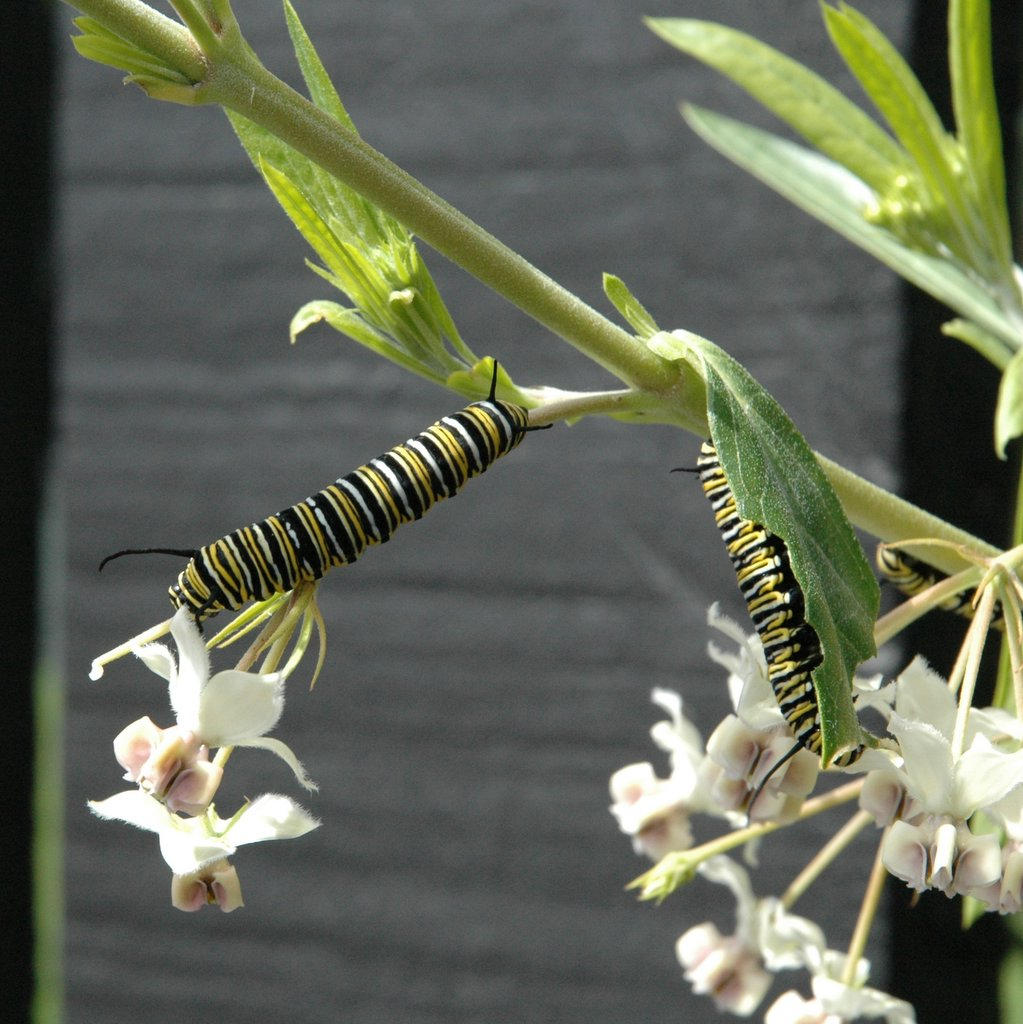
Monarch butterfly caterpillars feeding on milkweed leaves

=== Plants ===
Calotropin is primarily generated by plants in the Asclepiadoideae family, and can be obtained or isolated from plant extracts of Calotropis gigantea and Calotropis procera. Asclepiadoideae plants are commonly regarded as poisonous, and are common around the world. Calotropin is found in the latex, leaves, and root bark. Ingestion of these plants is toxic to mammals, and can be life-threatening.

=== Insects ===
Monarch butterflies are one of many insects that feed on milkweed plants. These butterflies feed on the North American milkweed (Asclepias) plants. These milkweeds are related to the Indian and North African milkweeds (Calotropis), which are consumed by the North African grasshopper Poekilocerus bufonis. These insects have adapted to the toxicity of the milkweed, are capable of safely sequestering cardenolides from the milkweed in glands or tissues during their early stages of development. The insects primarily retain calotropin and calactin (a configurational isomer), even though other cardenolides exist in the plant latex and leaves. These poisons, while not harmful to the insect, make it unpalatable to birds and mammals, and therefore serve as a defense mechanism. Monarch butterflies also store several volatile pyrazines, which give off an odor, which is a warning signal to predators to avoid the insect. P. bufonis is capable of utilizing calotropin in its defensive spray.

== See also ==
- Calotropis gigantea
- Calotropis procera
- Digitalis
- Milkweed
