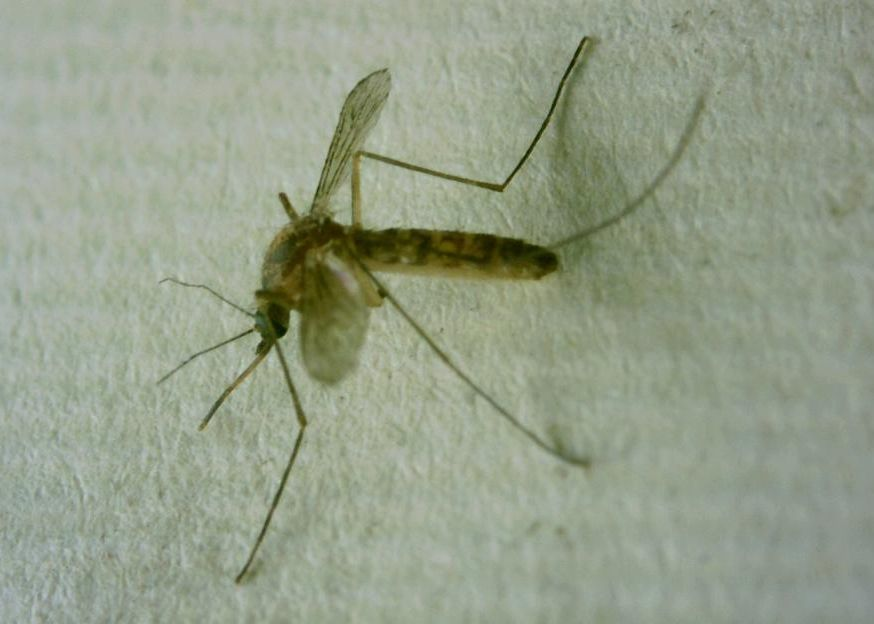

Scientific classification
- Domain: Eukaryota
- Kingdom: Animalia
- Phylum: Arthropoda
- Class: Insecta
- Order: Diptera
- Family: Culicidae
- Genus: Culex
- Species: C. gelidus

Binomial name
- Culex gelidus Theobald, 1901

Synonyms
- Culex cuneatus Theobald, 1901; Leucomyia bipunctata Theobald, 1907

= Culex gelidus =

Species of mosquito

Culex (Culex) gelidus is a species of mosquito belonging to the genus Culex. It is found in India, Sri Lanka, Bangladesh, Cambodia, China, Hong Kong, India, Indonesia, Japan, Laos, Malaysia, Myanmar, Nepal, New Guinea (Island); Papua New Guinea, Pakistan, Philippines, Taiwan, Thailand, Vietnam. In 1976, it was identified as a major vector of Japanese encephalitis virus, in India. From an experiment, it was evident that aqueous solution of Calotropis gigantea leaves possess larvicidal activity, mosquito repellent activity and ovicidal activity against Culex gelidus.
