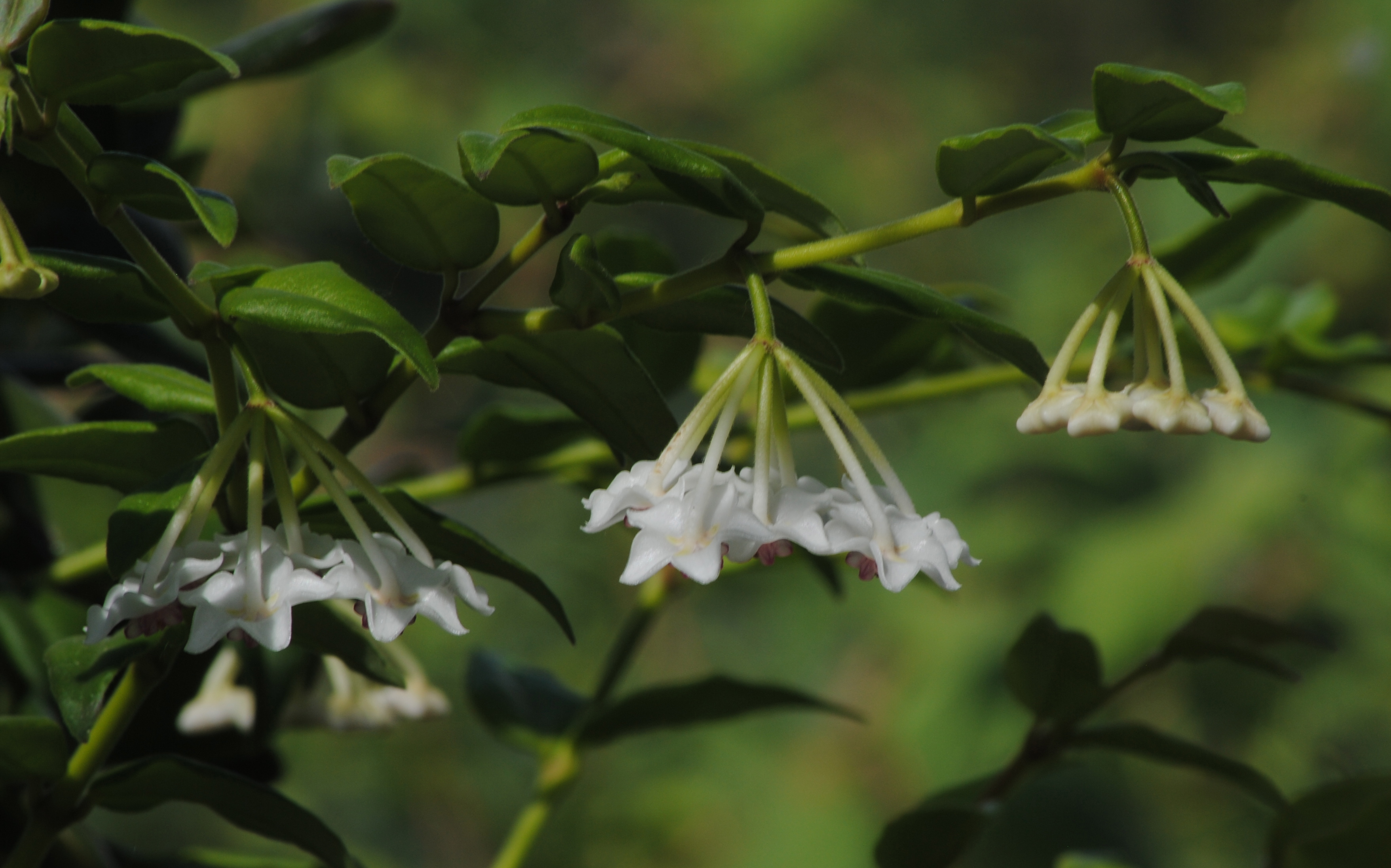
- Hoya lanceolata

Scientific classification
- Kingdom: Plantae
- Clade: Tracheophytes
- Clade: Angiosperms
- Clade: Eudicots
- Clade: Asterids
- Order: Gentianales
- Family: Apocynaceae
- Genus: Hoya
- Species: H. lanceolata

Binomial name
- Hoya lanceolata Wall. ex D.Don

= Hoya lanceolata =

Species of flowering plant

Hoya lanceolata is a species of flowering plant in the family Apocynaceae. It is native to the Himalayas, Nepal, Assam, Bangladesh, Myanmar, south-central China, and Vietnam. Its subspecies, Hoya lanceolata subsp. bella, the beautiful wax plant, has gained the Royal Horticultural Society's Award of Garden Merit, but some authorities recognize it as its own species, Hoya bella.
