= Panch pallava =

Pallava or "Pālave" is (a Prakrit form) "Pallava"

Pālave Maratha" refers to the Pālave or Pallava Maratha family, whose name is a Prakrit form of the historical Pallava dynasty. The connection is based on shared lineage or gotra with the Pallavas, and some historians link the Pallavas to an ancestor named Ashvatthama.

A theory suggests a connection through Ashvatthama, a figure in the Mahabharata. According to this theory, the Pallavas' ancestor was born from Ashvatthama's union with a Naga princess, and the Pālave Maratha family shares the same Bharadwaja gotra attributed to the Pallavas, say.

== See also ==
- Pallava dynasty

== Sources ==
- Maráthas and Dekhani Musalmáns: Handbooks for the Indian Army. By R. M. Betham. Published by Asian Educational Services, 1996, p. 153. ISBN 81-206-1204-3. ISBN 978-81-206-1204-4.
- Census of India, 1901. India. Census Commissioner. Printed at the Rajputana Mission Press, 1903, v. 1, p. 99.
