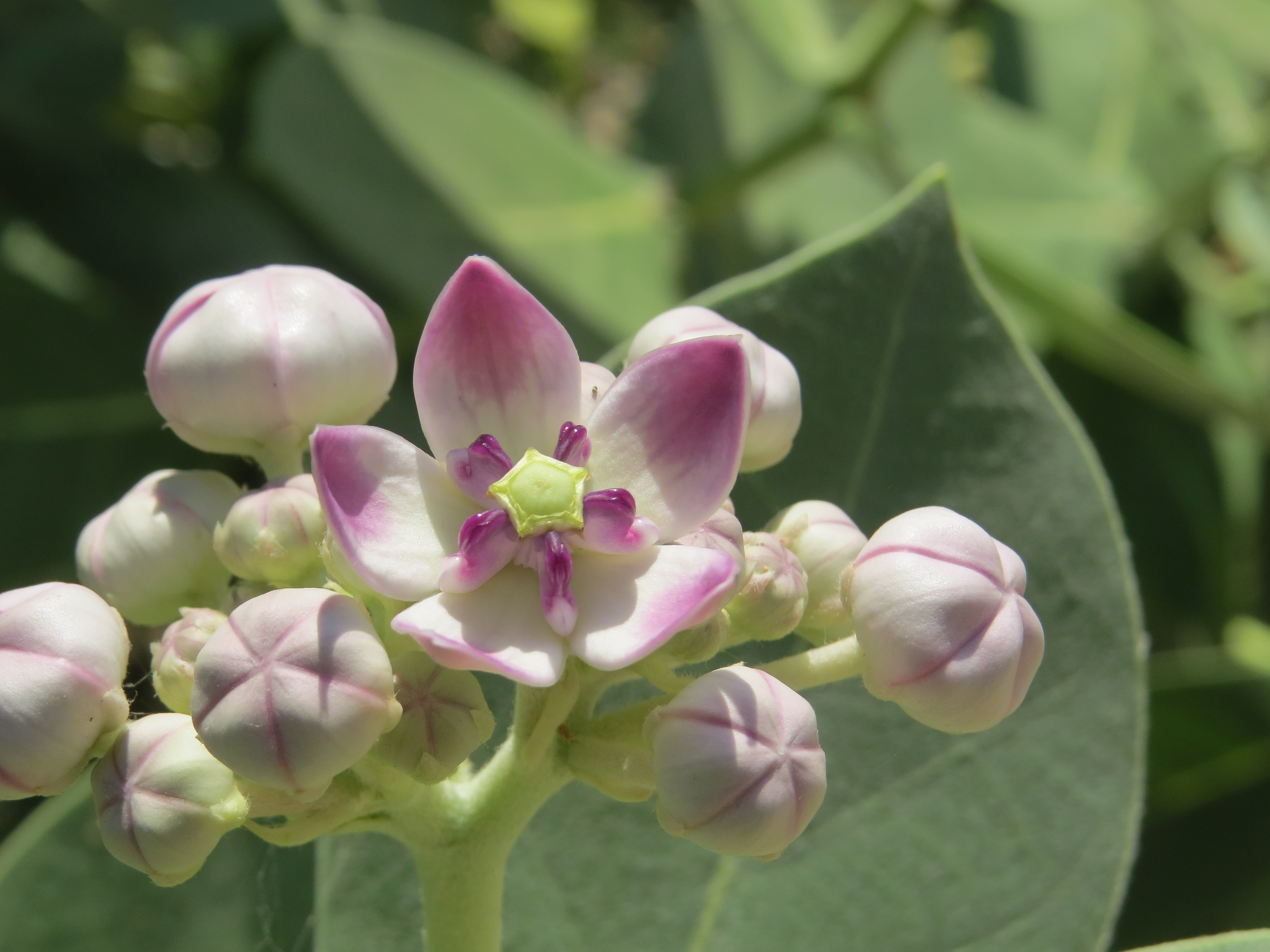

Conservation status
- Least Concern (IUCN 3.1)

Scientific classification
- Kingdom: Plantae
- Clade: Tracheophytes
- Clade: Angiosperms
- Clade: Eudicots
- Clade: Asterids
- Order: Gentianales
- Family: Apocynaceae
- Genus: Calotropis
- Species: C. procera

Binomial name
- Calotropis procera (Aiton) W.T.Aiton

Synonyms
- Asclepias procera Aiton

= Calotropis procera =

Species of plant

Calotropis procera is a species of flowering plant in the family Apocynaceae that is native to Northern and Tropical Africa, Western Asia, South Asia and Indochina (mainland Southeast Asia).

Common names for the plant include apple of Sodom, Sodom apple, roostertree, king's crown, small crownflower, giant milkweed, rubber bush, and rubber tree. The names "Apple of Sodom" and "Dead Sea Apple" stem from the ancient authors Josephus and Tacitus, who described the plant growing in the area of biblical Sodom. Although not native to the New World, the plant (and other related milkweed species) has been cultivated, and feeds monarch butterfly caterpillars, in places such as California, Hawaii and the island of Puerto Rico. In Arabic, it is known as al-ashkhar.

== Description ==
Calotropis procera typically reaches a height between 6 feet (1.8 m) to 8 feet (2.4 m), and rarely to as high as 15 feet (4.6 m), and grows in sunny to partly-shaded habitats such as disturbed and overgrazed lands, rangeland, roadsides, river flats and coastal dunes.

=== Toxicity ===
The green fruits of Calotropis procera contain a toxic milky sap that is extremely bitter and turns into a latex-like substance, which is resistant to soap. The milky sap contains a complex mix of chemicals, some of which are steroidal heart poisons known as "cardiac aglycones". These belong to the same chemical family as similar ones found in foxgloves (Digitalis purpurea). The plant contains steroidal components that are the cause of its toxicity. In the case of the Calotropis glycosides, their names are calotropin, calotoxin, calactin, uscharidin and voruscharin.

== History and traditional uses ==
=== Levant ===
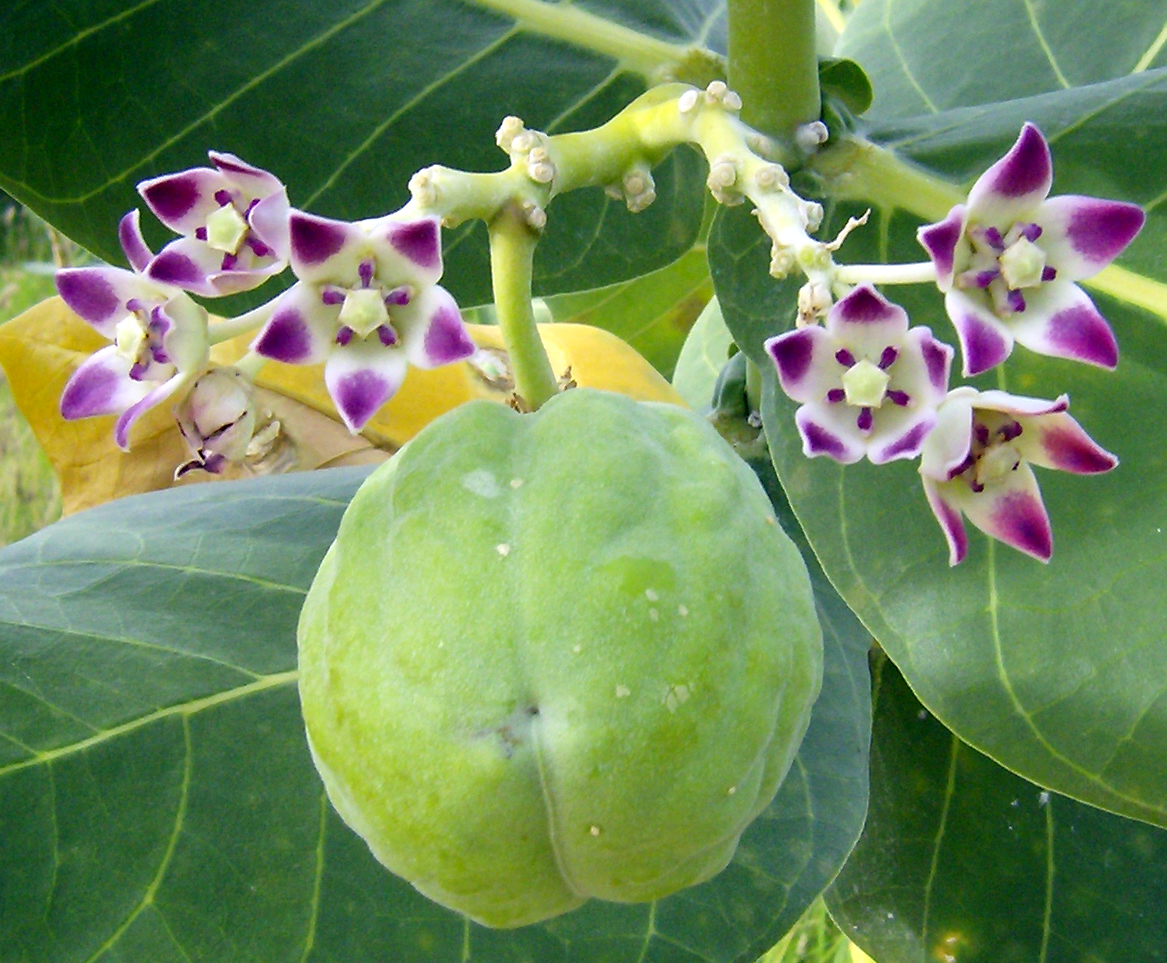
Flower and fruit

Some biblical commentators believe that the ashkhar may have been the poisonous gourd (or poison-tasting gourd) that led to "death in the pot" in 2 Kings 4:38–41. In this story, a well-meaning servant of the prophet Elisha gathers herbs and many unknown gourds and casts them into the pot. After the outcry from the band of prophets, Elisha instructs them to cast flour into the stew pot, and they are saved.

In 1938, botanists Hannah and Ephraim HaReuveni, authors of "The Squill and the Asphodel" and parents of Noga Hareuveni, speculated that the עַרְעָ֣ר ʿaʿār was the ashkhar. The fibre of the ashkhar may have been used for the linen of the High Priest of Israel. The fruit is described by the Roman Jewish historian Josephus, who saw it growing near what he calls Sodom, near the Dead Sea: "[A]s well as the ashes growing in their fruits; which fruits have a color as if they were fit to be eaten, but if you pluck them with your hands, they dissolve into smoke and ashes." The ashkhar is listed in the Mishnah and Talmud. The fibers attached to the seeds may have been used as wicks. However, according to the Mishnah, it is one of the rabbinically prohibited activities of Shabbat.

In his Biblical Researches in Palestine, American biblical scholar Edward Robinson describes it as the fruit of the Asclepias gigantea vel procera, a tree 10–15 feet high, with a grayish cork-like bark called ʿosher by local Arabs. He says the fruit resembled "a large, smooth apple or orange, hanging in clusters of three or four." When "pressed or struck, it explodes with a puff, like a bladder or puff-ball, leaving only the shreds of the thin rind and a few fibers. It is filled chiefly with air, which gives it the round form, while in the center, a small, slender pod runs through it which contains a small quantity of fine silk, which local Arabs collect and twist into matches for their guns."

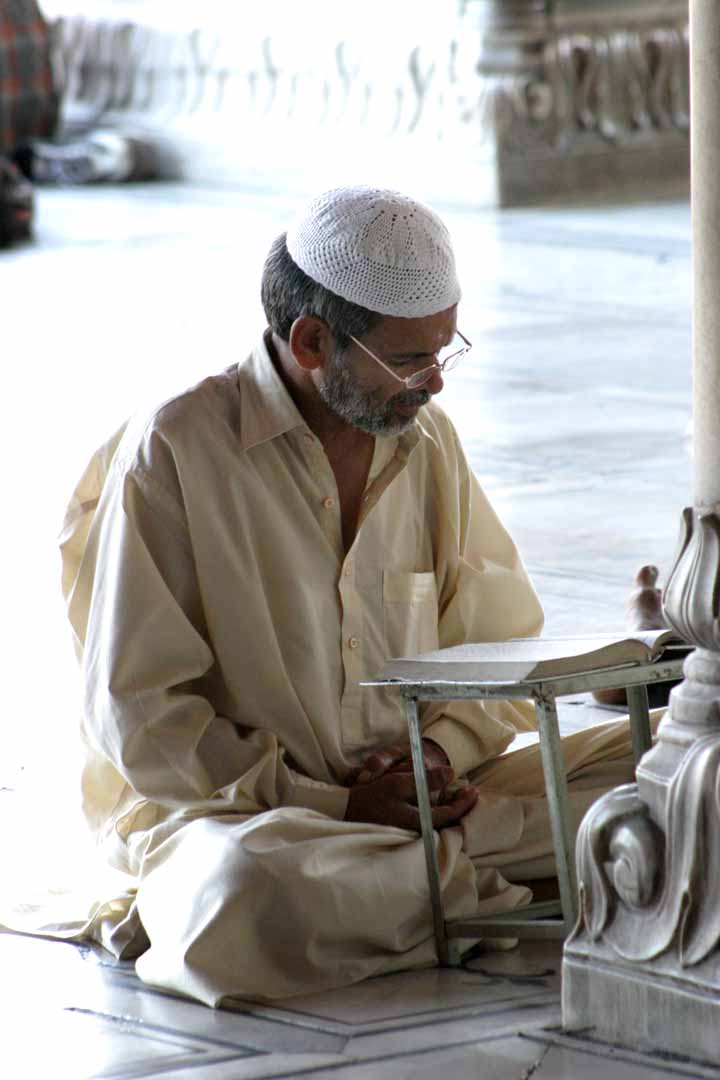
A man wearing a crochet taqiyah

Bedouins of the Sinai Peninsula and Negev traditionally made use of the fibers of this plant for making taqiyah (skullcaps).

=== Arabian peninsula ===
Commonly known as ashkhar, (Arabic: أشخر) in Arabic, it is a common desert shrub with a wide range of medicinal applications in traditional Bedouin medicine. It has been linked to several cases of poisoning and corneal damage caused by children unknowingly touching its sap and then their eyes. Bedouins have long held that the plant causes blindness if contact is made with the eyes and any part of the plant. Its roots were traditionally burned and used as a component of gunpowder by Bedouins in the Trucial States.

=== West Indies ===
The plant is known to occur throughout the tropical belt and is also common in the West Indies (e.g. Jamaica, Puerto Rico), where the locals know it as "pillow cotton". When the ripe "apples" burst, the fibrous contents are ejected along with the seeds.

=== South Africa ===
The giant milkweed is used for fibre and medicine in Southern Africa, but it rapidly invades subsistence agricultural fields reducing yields. The plant is poisonous if eaten by livestock. It thrives in the hot northern regions of Limpopo Province. This plant is also found along road verges and in drainage lines.

=== Australia ===
In Australia, it is a weed of Western Australia, the Northern Territory, South Australia and Queensland. It is thought to have arrived in the Northern Territory via the seeds which have tufts of silky hairs: the silky material (originating in Africa or Asia) having been used as padding in camel saddles. In the Northern Territory, it is found on alluvial plains, ephemeral watercourses and run-on areas. It also occurs on red earth plains and heavy soil plains.

== Literary and musical references ==
John Milton alludes to this plant in his epic poem Paradise Lost while describing the fruit that Satan and his cohorts eat after having tempted Adam and Eve to eat an apple from the tree of the knowledge of good and evil:

...greedy they pluck'd
The Frutage fair to sight, like that which grew
Neer that bituminous Lake where Sodom flam'd;
This more delusive, not the touch, but taste
Deceav'd; they fondly thinking to allay
Thir appetite with gust, instead of Fruit
Chewd bitter Ashes, which th' offended taste
With spattering noise rejected: oft they assayd
Hunger and thirst constraining...

— Paradise Lost (2nd ed.) Book 10 lines 560–568

Marilyn Manson recorded a song named "Apple of Sodom" for the soundtrack album of the 1997 David Lynch film Lost Highway.

== Gallery ==
Plant

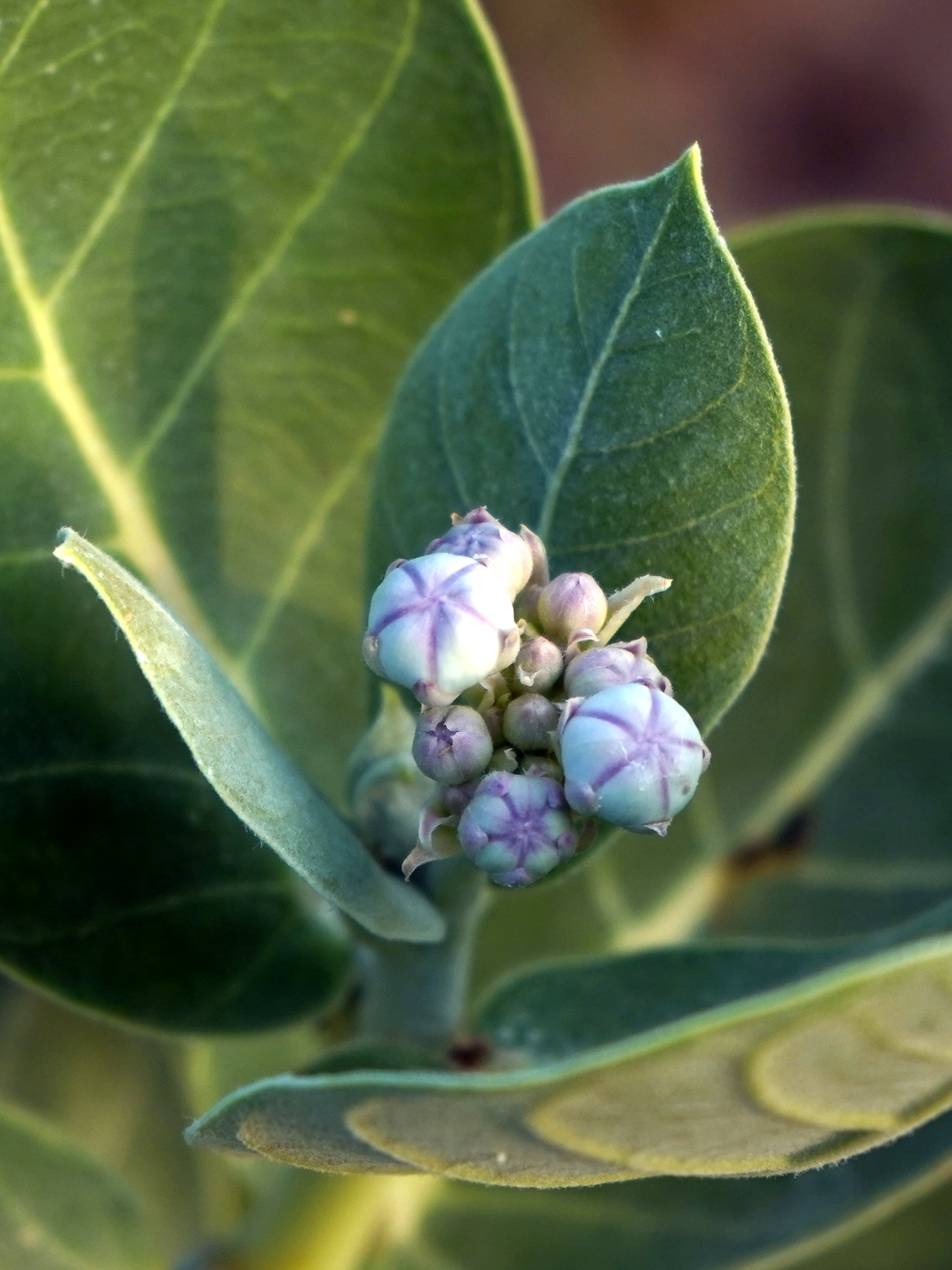
Buds

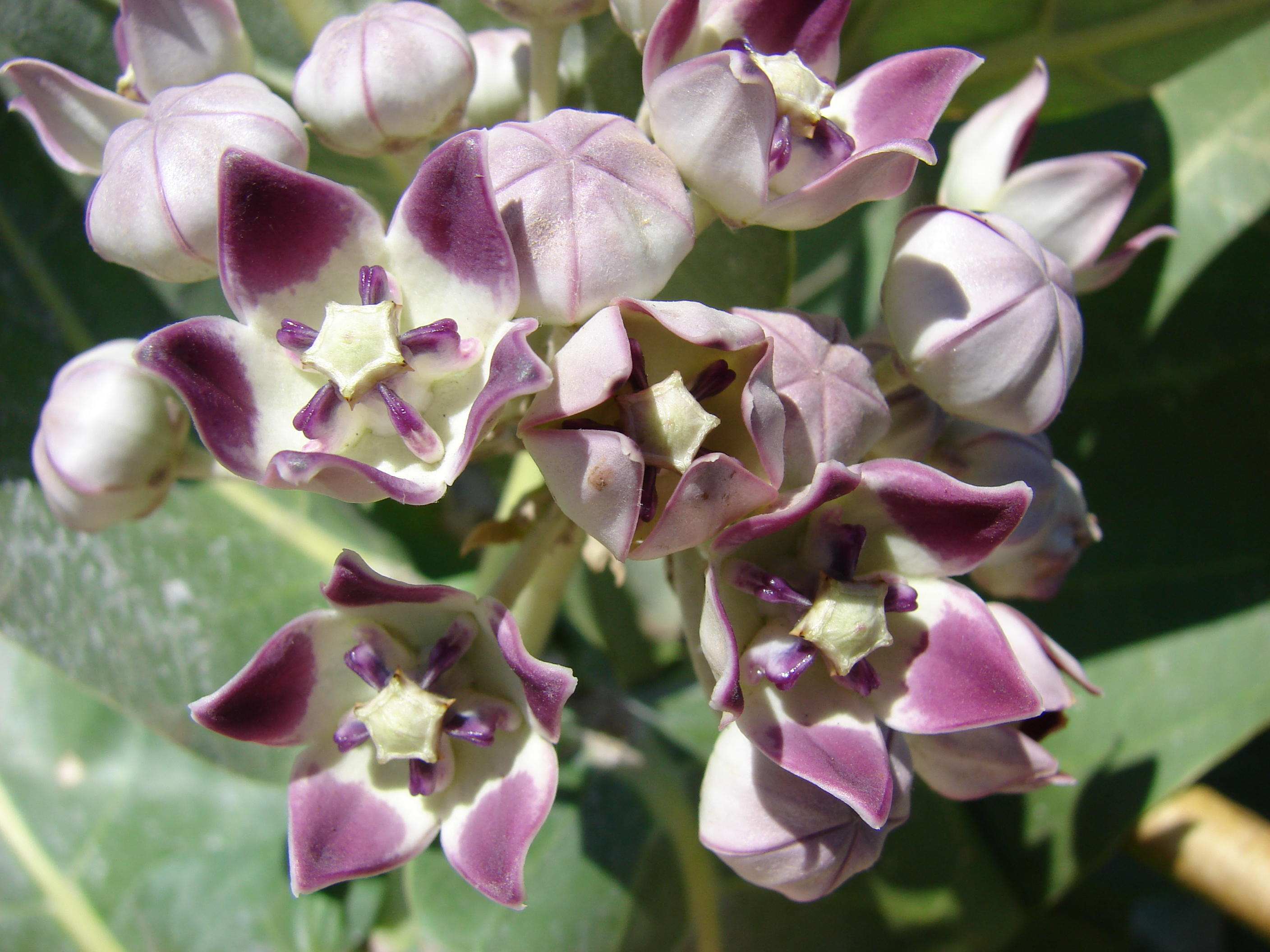
Flowers

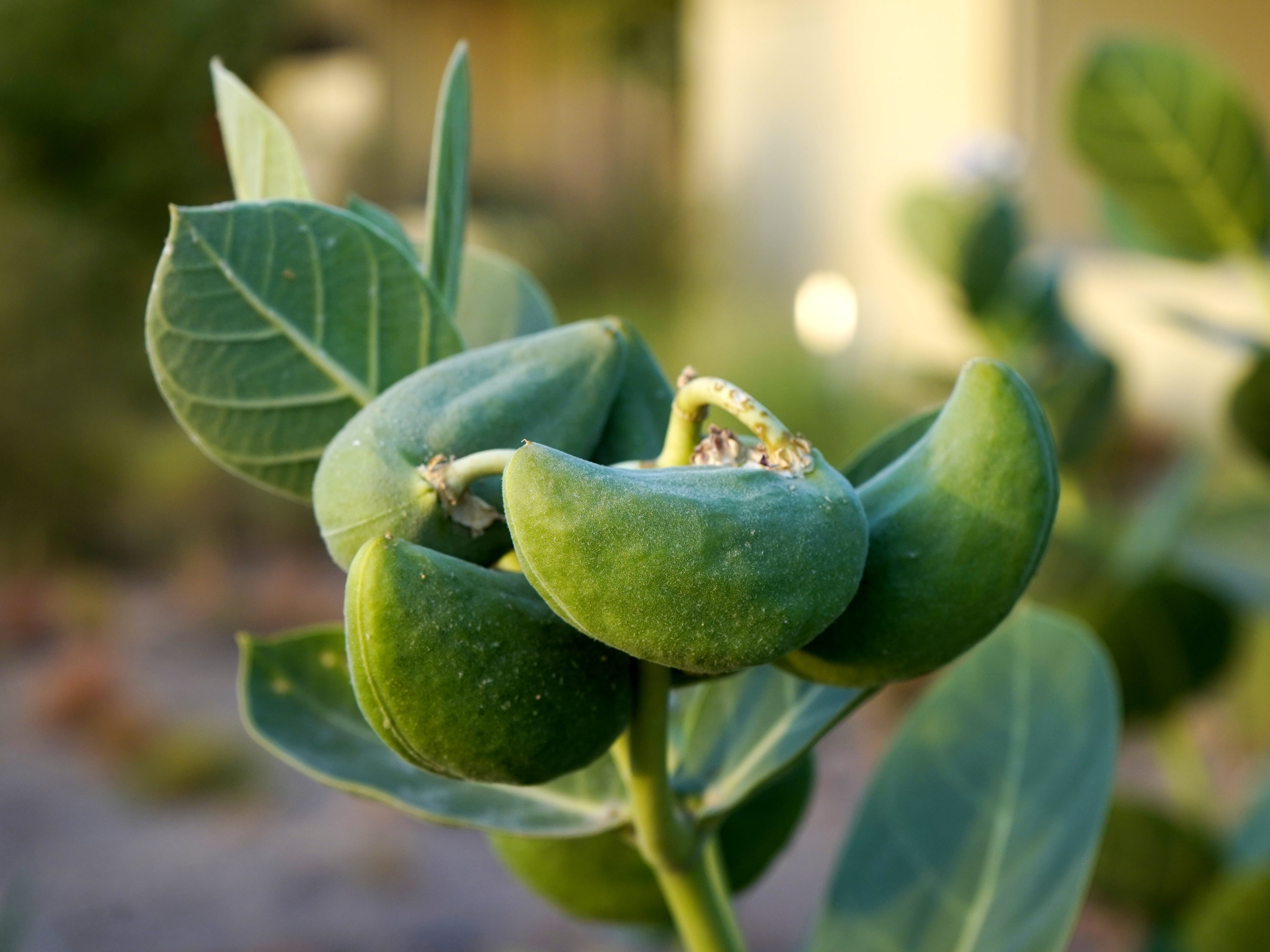
Fruit

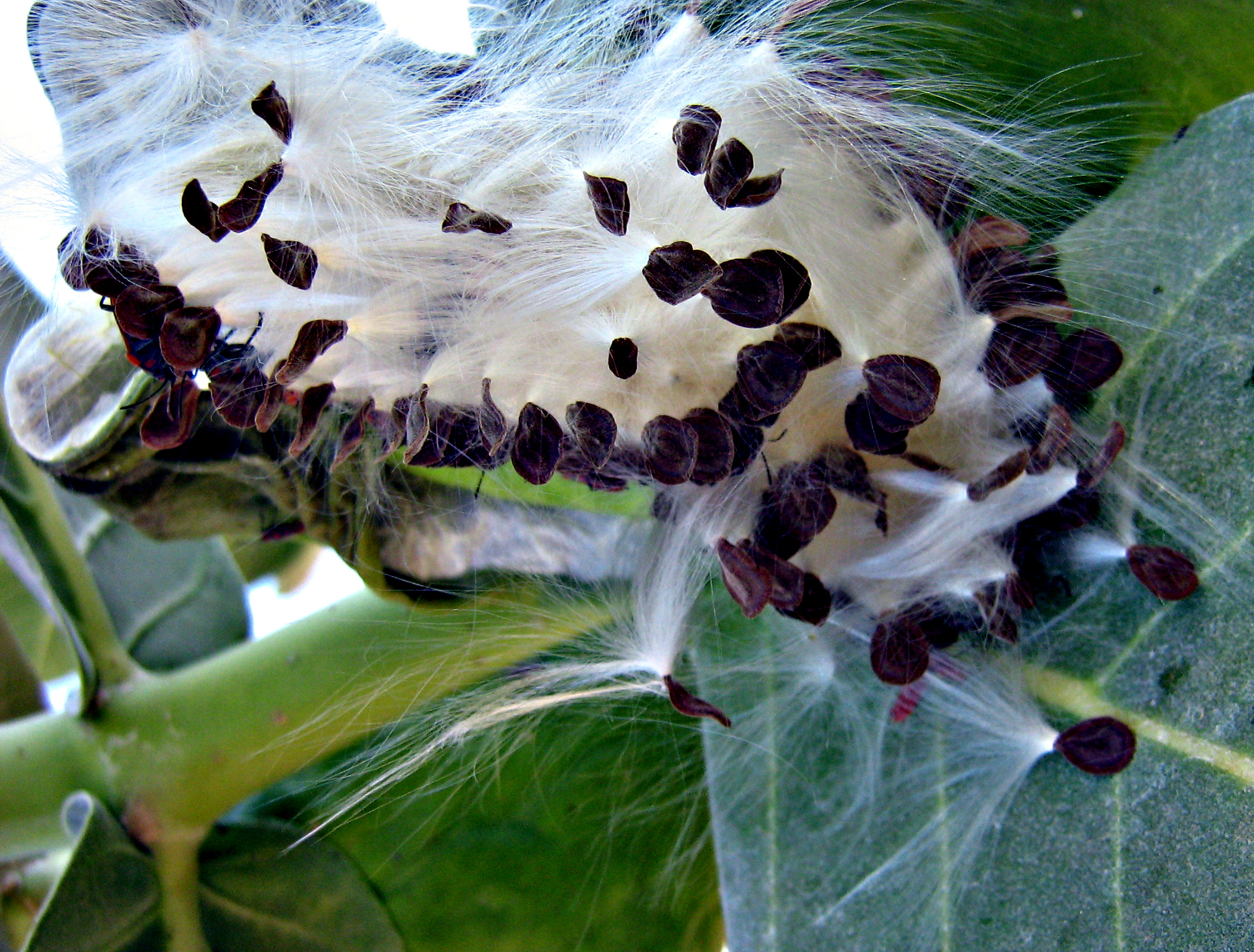
Seeds
