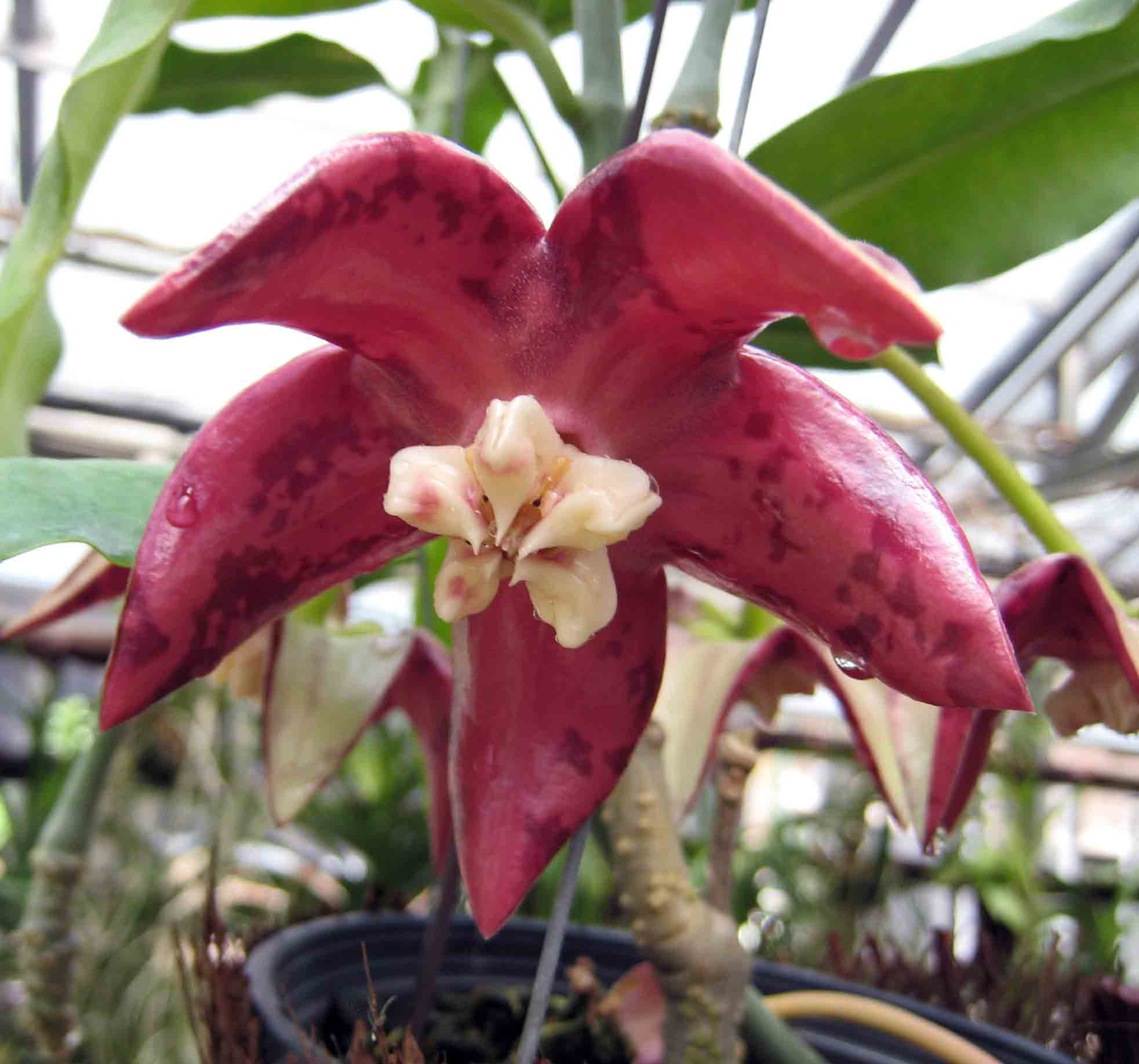
- H. imperialis has some of the largest flowers in its genus
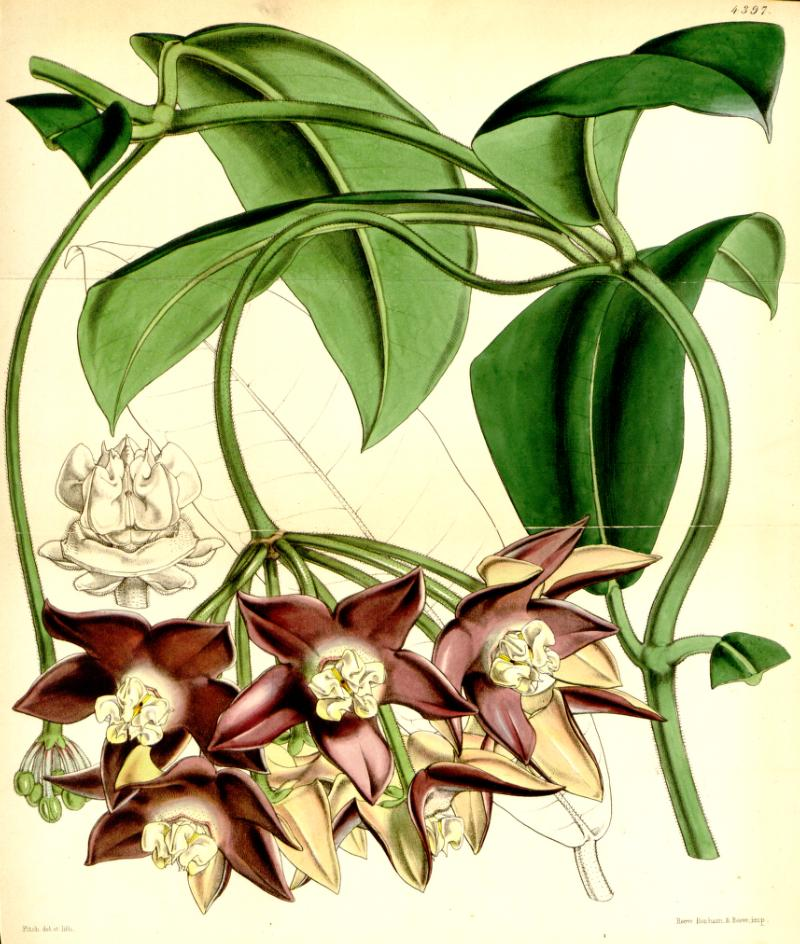
- Botanical illustration

Scientific classification
- Kingdom: Plantae
- Clade: Tracheophytes
- Clade: Angiosperms
- Clade: Eudicots
- Clade: Asterids
- Order: Gentianales
- Family: Apocynaceae
- Genus: Hoya
- Species: H. imperialis

Binomial name
- Hoya imperialis Lindl.

Synonyms
- Calotropis sussuela G.Don; Hoya imperialis var. rauschii Regel

= Hoya imperialis =

Species of plant

Hoya imperialis, the imperial wax flower, is a widespread species of flowering plant in the family Apocynaceae. It is native to southern Thailand and western and central Malesia. An epiphyte, it is typically found in lowland wet tropical forests. It is often kept as an ornamental.

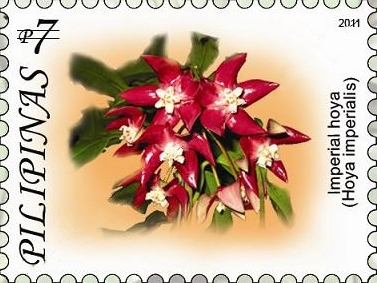
On a postage stamp of the Philippines
