= Common tiger =

Common tiger may refer to:

- Ictinogomphus ferox, a dragonfly of Africa
- Danaus genutia, a butterfly of India, also called the striped tiger
- Danaus melanippus, a butterfly of tropical Asia, also called the black veined tiger
- Danaus plexippus, a butterfly of North America, also called the monarch

== See also ==
- Tiger
