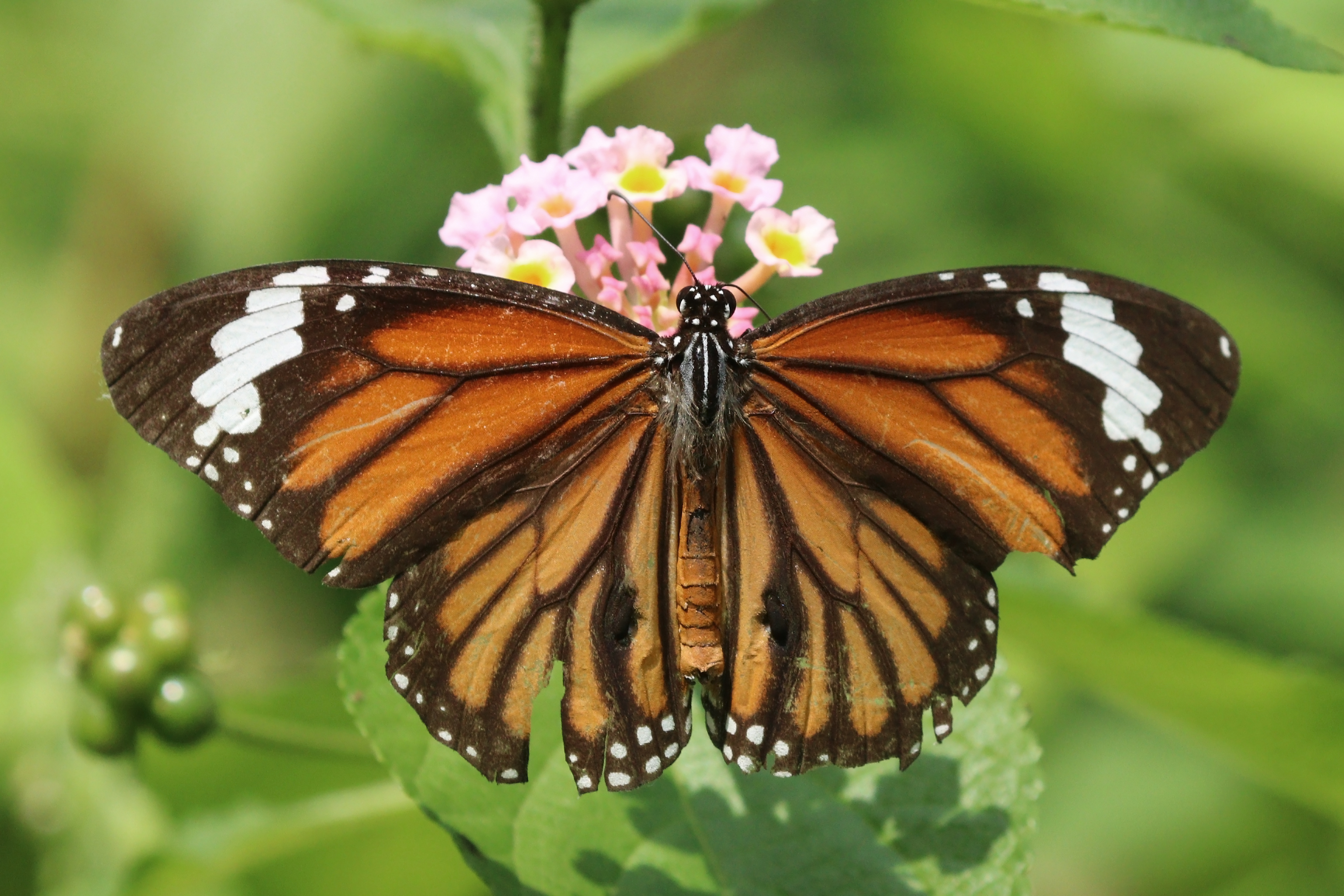
- Upperside
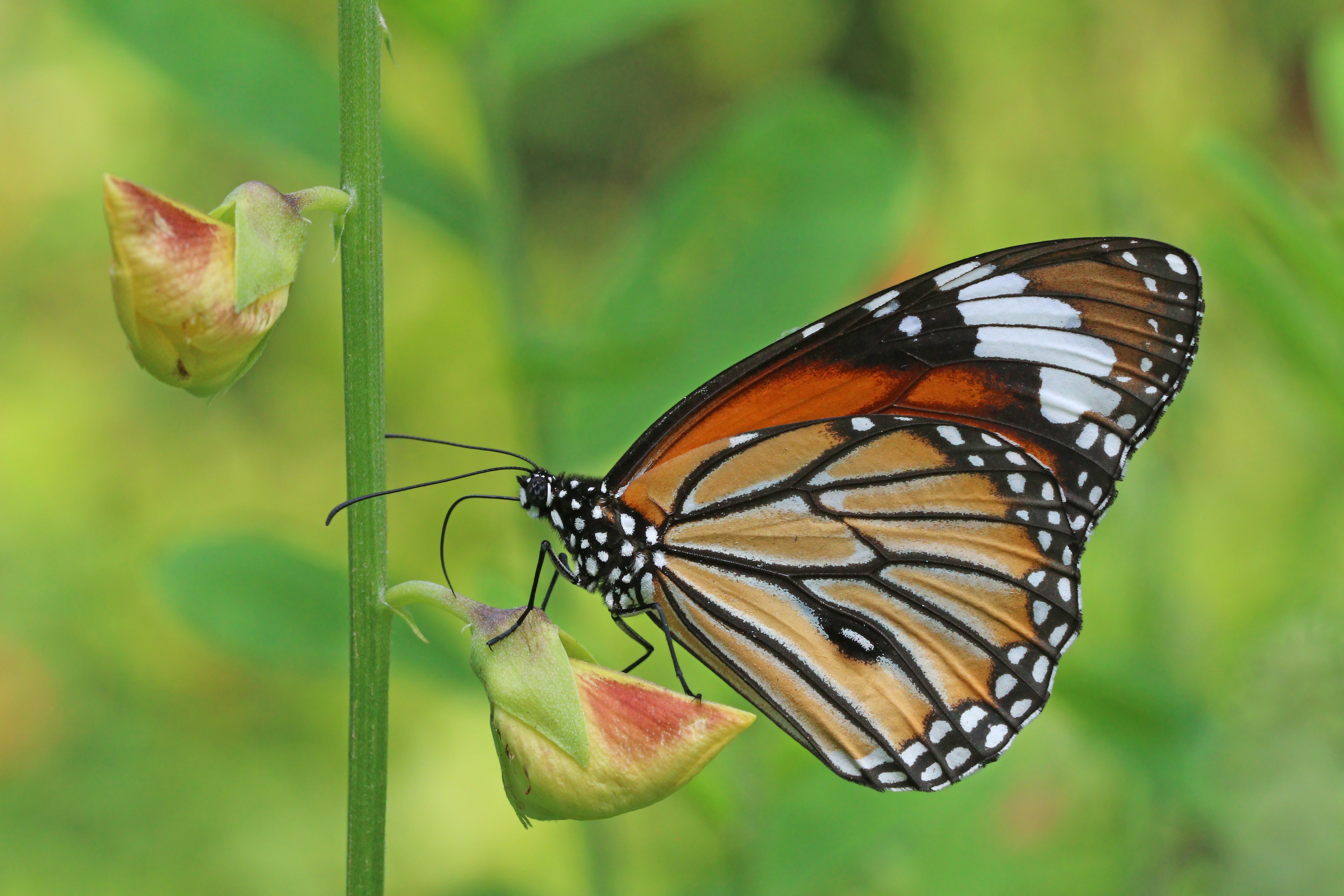
- Male, underside

Scientific classification
- Kingdom: Animalia
- Phylum: Arthropoda
- Clade: Pancrustacea
- Class: Insecta
- Order: Lepidoptera
- Family: Nymphalidae
- Genus: Danaus
- Species: D. genutia

Binomial name
- Danaus genutia (Cramer, [1779])

Synonyms
- Papilio genutia Cramer, [1779]; Danaus adnana Swinhoe, 1917; Danaus plexippus plexippus f. albipars Talbot, 1943; Danaus bandjira Martin, 1911; Danaus bimana Martin, 1911; Danaida plexippus plexippus f. grynion Fruhstorfer, 1907; Danaus nipalensis Moore, 1877; Danaus sumbana Talbot, 1943; Danaus tuak Pryer & Cator, 1894; Danaus uniens Martin, 1911; Salatura intermedia Moore, 1883; Salatura intensa Moore, 1883; Salatura laratensis Butler, 1883; Danaida alexis Waterhouse & Lyell, 1914

= Danaus genutia =

Common tiger

Species of butterfly

Danaus genutia, the common tiger, is one of the common butterflies of India. It belongs to the "crows and tigers", that is, the Danainae group of the brush-footed butterflies family. The butterfly is also called striped tiger in India to differentiate it from the equally common plain tiger, Danaus chrysippus. The species was first described by Pieter Cramer in 1779.

== Description ==
The butterfly closely resembles the monarch butterfly (Danaus plexippus) of the Americas. The wingspan is 70 to 95 millimetres (2.8 to 3.7 in). Both sexes of the butterfly have tawny wings with veins marked with broad black bands. The male has a pouch on the hindwing. The margins of the wings are black with two rows of white spots. The underside of the wings resembles the upperside but is paler in colouration. The male common tiger has a prominent black-and-white spot on the underside of the hindwing. In drier regions the tawny part of the hindwing pales and approaches white in colour making it very similar to the white tiger (D. melanippus).

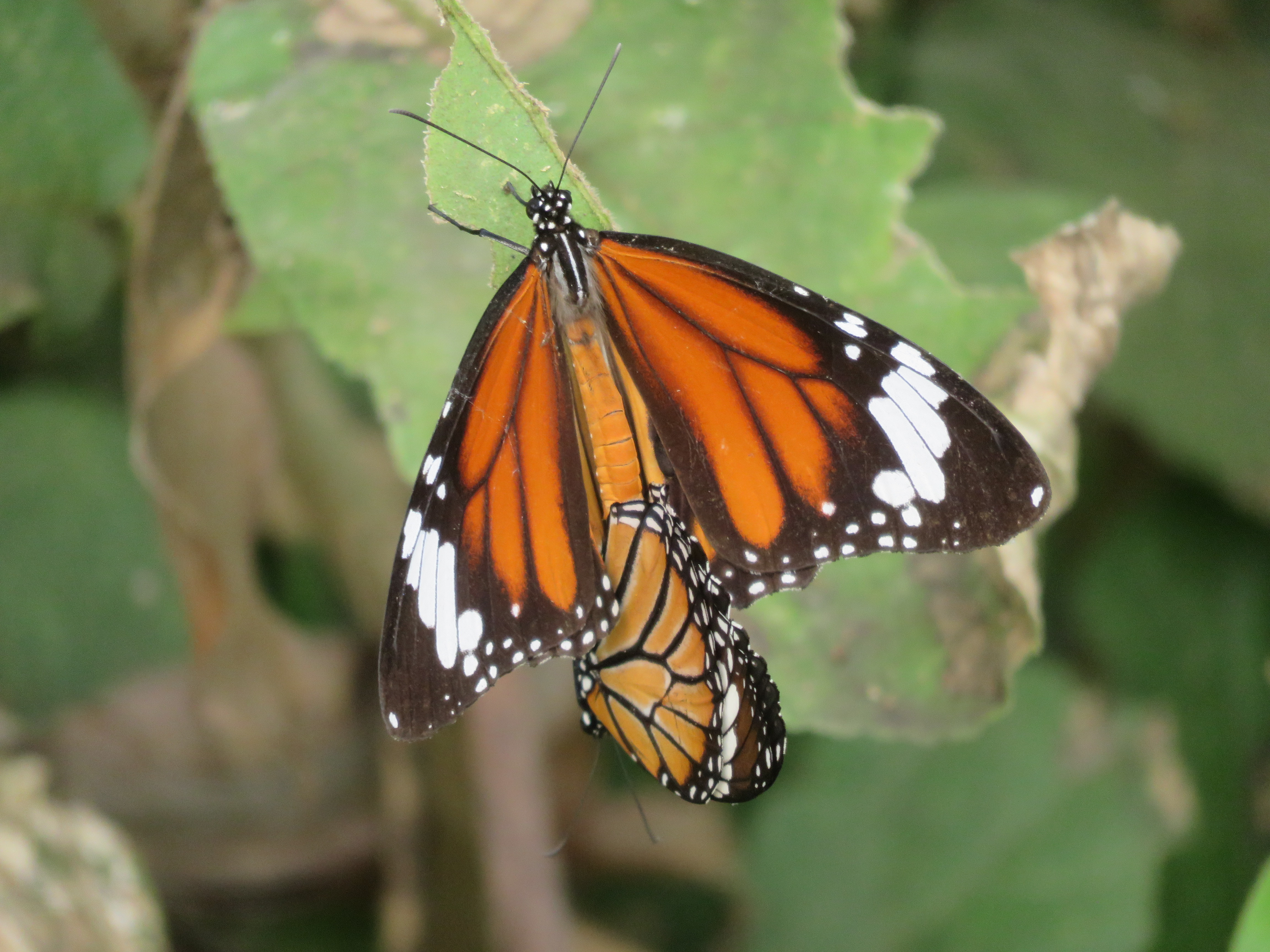
Pairing in Bihar, India

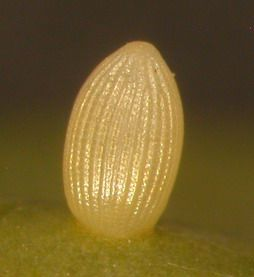
Egg

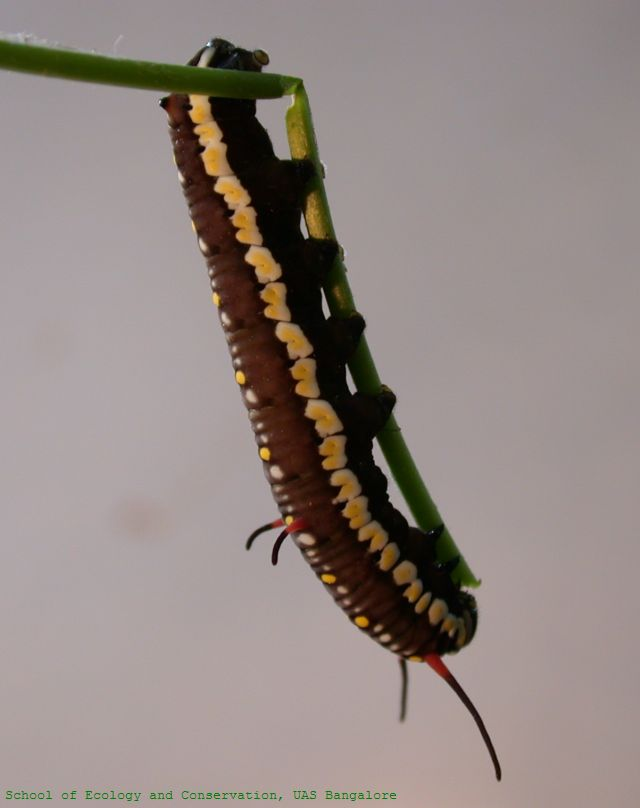
Caterpillar

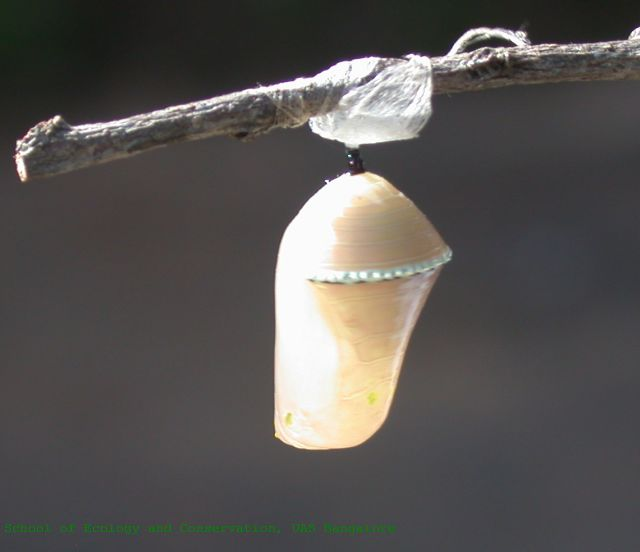
Pupa

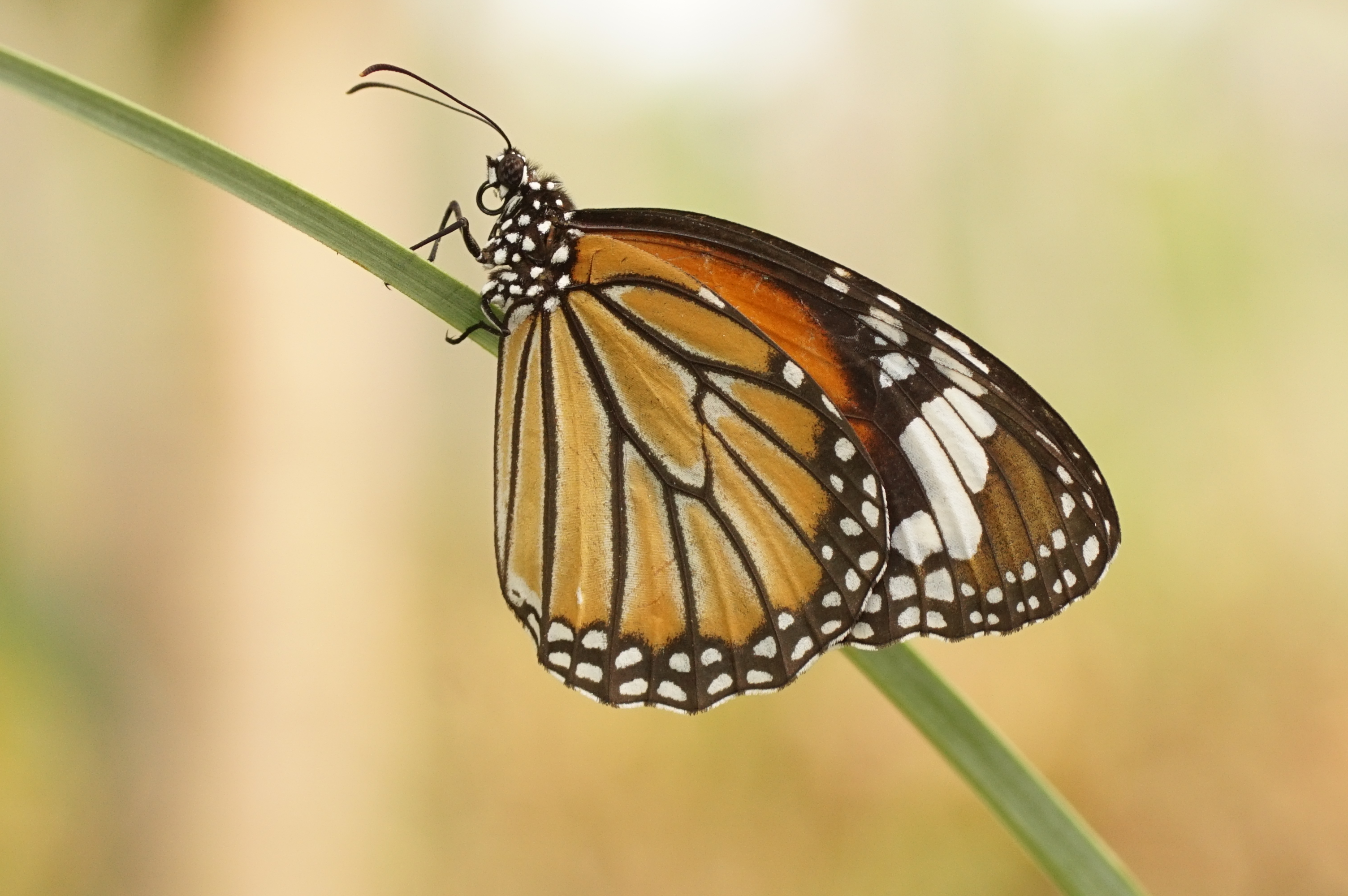
Female in Kerala

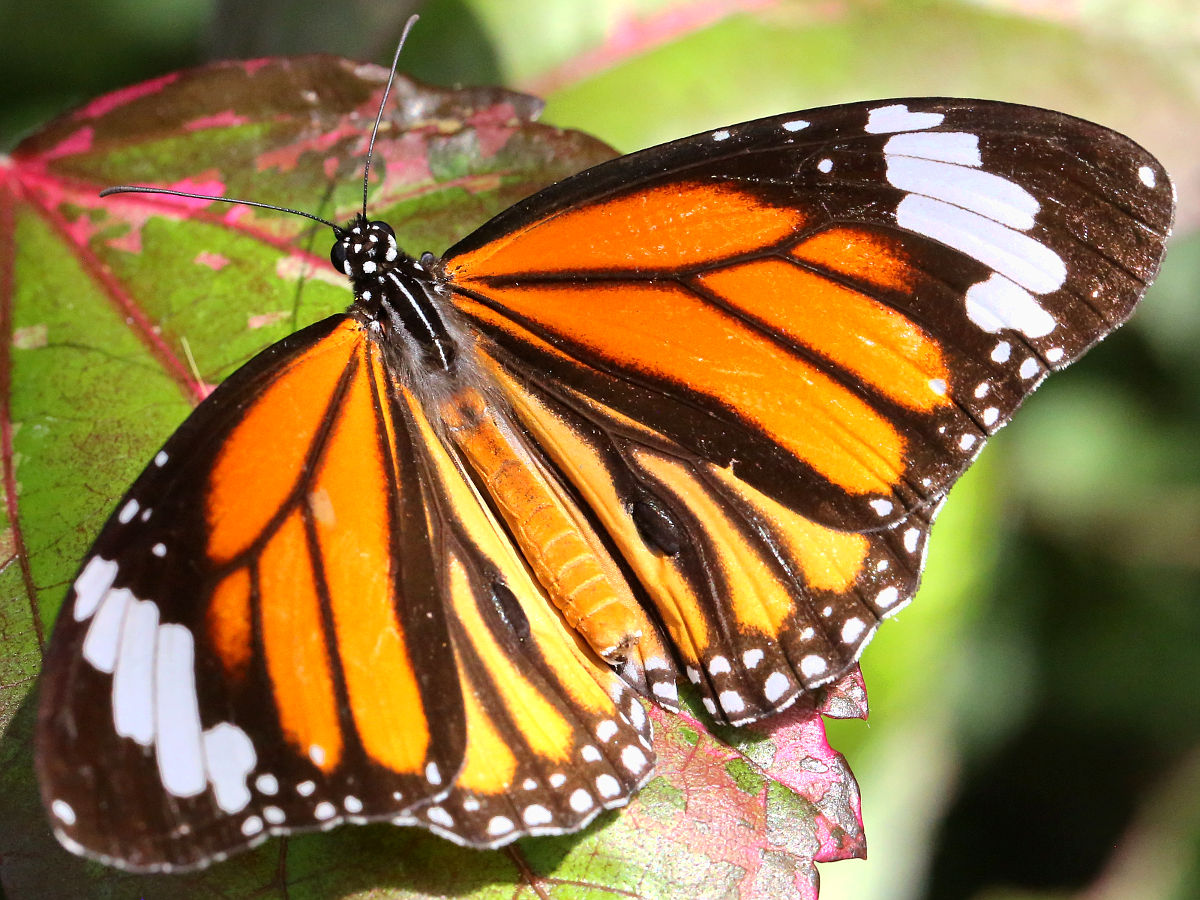
Male in Chiang Mai

== Distribution and ecology ==
D. genutia is distributed throughout India, Sri Lanka, Myanmar and extending to South-East Asia and Australia (except New Guinea). At least in the South Asian part of its range it is fairly common, locally very common.

This butterfly occurs in scrub jungles, fallow land adjacent to habitation, dry and moist deciduous forests, preferring areas of moderate to heavy rainfall. Also occurs in degraded hill slopes and ridges, both, bare or denuded, and, those covered with secondary growth.

While it is a strong flier, it never flies rapidly or high. It has stronger and faster strokes than the plain tiger. The butterfly ranges forth in search of its host and nectar plants. It visits gardens where it nectars on the flowers of Adelocaryum, Cosmos, Celosia, Lantana, Zinnia, and similar flowers.

=== Defence against predators, mimicry ===
Members of this genus are leathery, tough to kill and fake death. Since they are unpleasant to smell and taste, they are soon released by the predators, recover and fly off soon thereafter. The butterfly sequesters toxins from plants of the family Asclepiadaceae. The butterflies also congregate with other danaines to sip from the sap of Crotalaria, Heliotropium and other plants which provide the pyrrolizidine alkaloids which they sequester. A study in north-eastern India showed a preference to foraging on Crotalaria juncea compared to Bauhinia purpurea, Barleria cristata rosea and Nerium oleander. To advertise their unpalatability, the butterfly has prominent markings with a striking colour pattern. The striped tiger is mimicked by both sexes of the Indian Tamil lacewing (Cethosia nietneri mahratta) and the leopard lacewing (Cethosia cyane) and females of the common palmfly (Elymnias hypermnestra).

=== Life history ===
This butterfly lays its egg singly under the leaves of any of its host plants of family Asclepiadaceae. The caterpillar is black and marked with bluish-white and yellow spots and lines. It has three pairs of tentacles on its body. It first eats the eggshell and then proceeds to eat leaves and vegetative parts of the plant. The chrysalis (pupa) is green and marked with golden-yellow spots.

The caterpillar of the common tiger butterfly obtains a supply of poison by eating poisonous plants, which make the caterpillar and butterfly a distasteful morsel for predators. The most common food plants of the common tiger in peninsular India are small herbs, twiners and creepers from the family Asclepiadaceae, including:

- Asclepias curassavica
- Ceropegia intermedia
- Cynanchum dalhousieae
- Raphistemma pulchellum
- Stephanotis species (including S. floribunda?)
- Tylophora tenuis

== Subspecies ==
It has some 16 subspecies; its evolutionary relationships are not completely resolved, but it appears to be closest to the Malay tiger (D. affinis) and white tiger.

- D. g. genutia (India to China, Sri Lanka, Andamans, Nicobars, Peninsular Malaya, Thailand, Langkawi, Singapore, Indochina, Taiwan, Hainan)
- D. g. sumatrana Moore, 1883 (western and north-eastern Sumatra)
- D. g. intermedia (Moore, 1883)
- D. g. conspicua Butler, 1866 (southern Sulawesi)
- D. g. niasicus Fruhstorfer, 1899 (Nias)
- D. g. intensa (Moore, 1883) (Java, Bali, Bawean, Borneo)
- D. g. partita (Fruhstorfer, 1897) (Lesser Sunda)
- D. g. leucoglene C. & R. Felder, 1865 (northern Sulawesi)
- D. g. tychius Fruhstorfer, 1910 (Selajar)
- D. g. telmissus Fruhstorfer, 1910 (Butong Island)
- D. g. wetterensis (Fruhstorfer, 1899) (Wetar Island, Timor)
- D. g. laratensis (Butler, 1883) (Tanimbar Island)
- D. g. kyllene Fruhstorfer, 1910 (Damar Island, Kai Island)
- D. g. alexis (Waterhouse & Lyell, 1914) (Northern Territory to north-western Australia)

.

== See also ==
- Danainae
- Nymphalidae
- List of butterflies of India
- List of butterflies of India (Nymphalidae)
