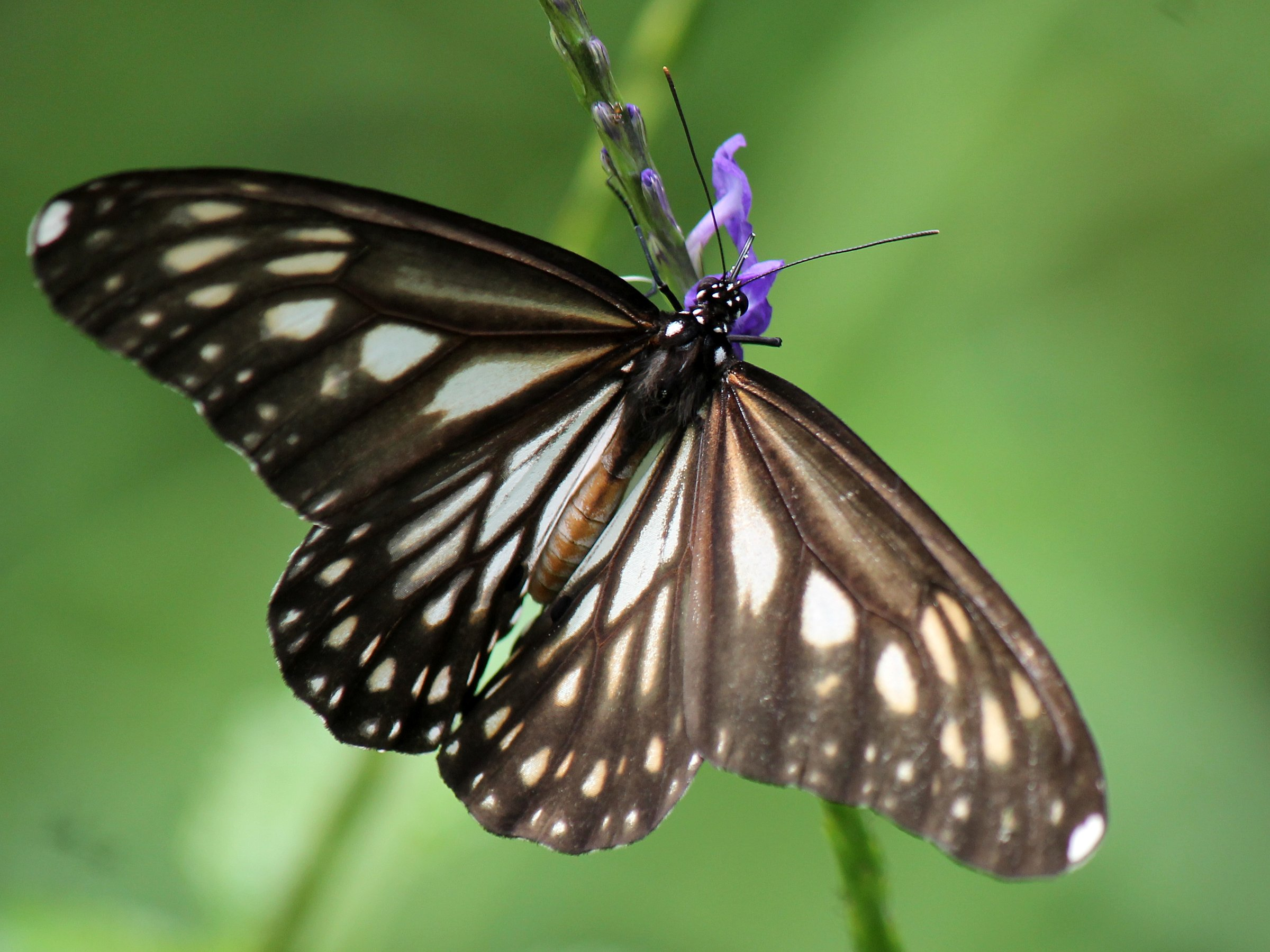

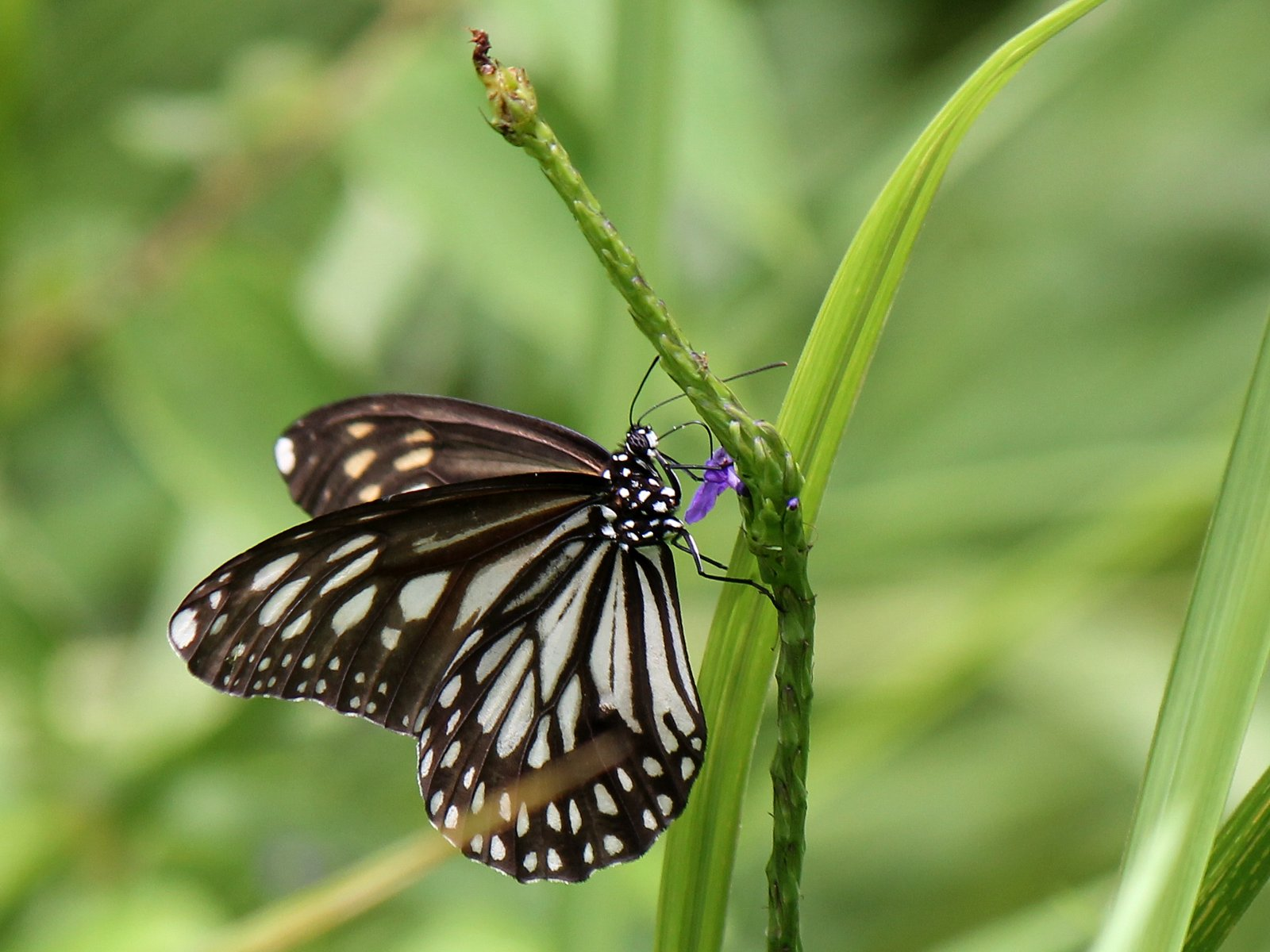

Scientific classification
- Domain: Eukaryota
- Kingdom: Animalia
- Phylum: Arthropoda
- Class: Insecta
- Order: Lepidoptera
- Family: Nymphalidae
- Genus: Danaus
- Species: D. ismare

Binomial name
- Danaus ismare (Cramer, [1780])

Synonyms
- Papilio ismare Cramer, [1780]; Papilio celebensis Rothschild, 1892

= Danaus ismare =

Ismare tiger

Species of butterfly

Danaus ismare, the ismare tiger, is a butterfly found in tropical Indonesia. It belongs to the brush-footed butterflies family.

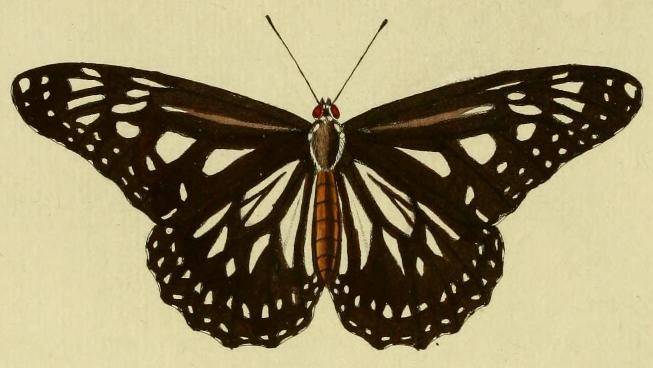

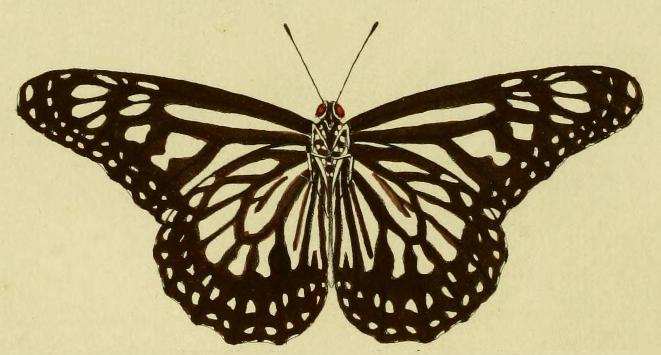

== Subspecies ==
- D. i. ismare (Moluccas)
- D. i. fulvus Ribbe, 1890 (south-eastern Sulawesi, Bangka, Bangai group, Talaud, Sangir)
- D. i. felicia Fruhstorfer, 1907 (Buru, Obi)
- D. i. ismareola Butler, 1866 (Halmahera, Ternate, Bachan)
- D. i. goramica Fruhstorfer, 1907 (Goram)
- D. i. alba Morishita, 1981 (northern Sulawesi, Sangihe, Talaus)

== See also ==
- Danainae
- Nymphalidae
