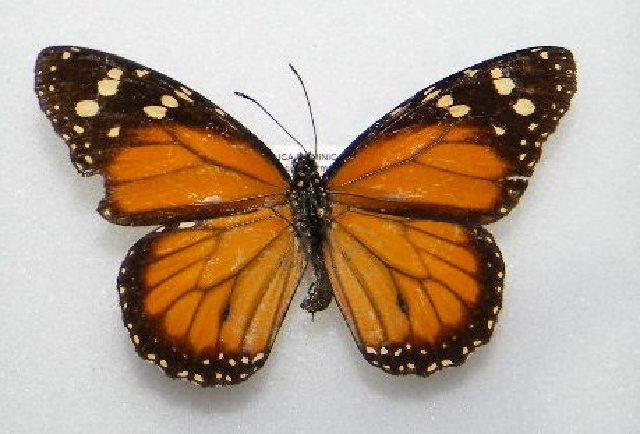
- Male

Conservation status
- Near Threatened (IUCN 2.3)

Scientific classification
- Kingdom: Animalia
- Phylum: Arthropoda
- Clade: Pancrustacea
- Class: Insecta
- Order: Lepidoptera
- Family: Nymphalidae
- Genus: Danaus
- Species: D. cleophile

Binomial name
- Danaus cleophile (Godart, 1819)

= Jamaican monarch =

Species of butterfly

The Jamaican monarch (Danaus cleophile) is a species of milkweed butterfly in the nymphalid Danainae subfamily. It is found on the Caribbean islands of Hispaniola (in the Dominican Republic and Haiti), and Jamaica.

== Taxonomy ==
There are two subspecies recognized:

- D. c. cleophile (Godart, 1819), from Hispaniola
- D. c. jamaicensis Turner & Turland, 2018, from Jamaica

The latter is smaller and darker in pigmentation.

== See also ==
- Monarch butterfly
