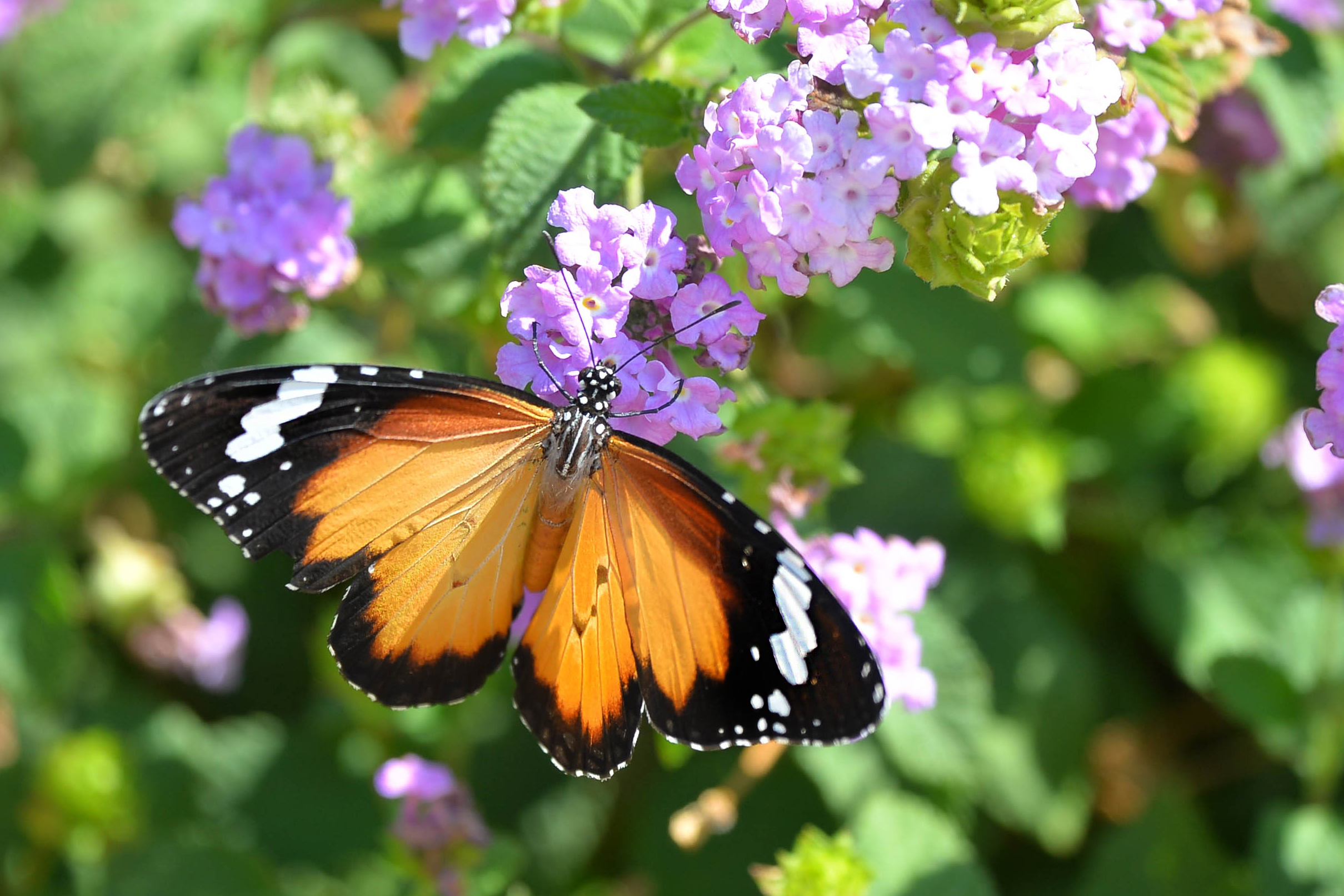
- Female feeding
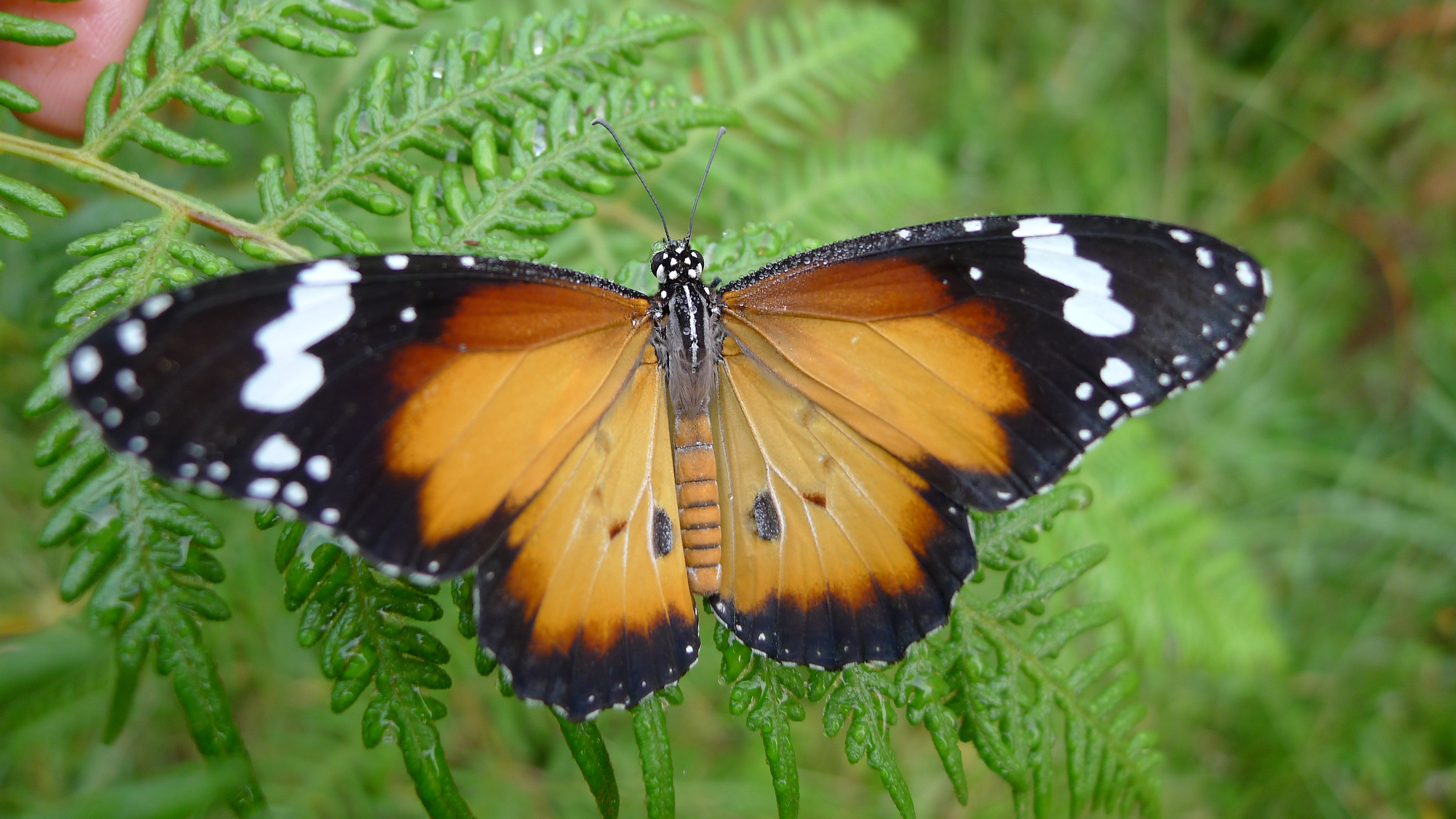
- Male

Scientific classification
- Kingdom: Animalia
- Phylum: Arthropoda
- Class: Insecta
- Order: Lepidoptera
- Family: Nymphalidae
- Genus: Danaus
- Species: D. petilia

Binomial name
- Danaus petilia (Stoll, 1790)

= Danaus petilia =

Lesser wanderer

Species of butterfly

Danaus petilia, the lesser wanderer, is a species of butterfly in the nymphalid Danainae subfamily. It is a migratory species which is found in Australia and in tropical countries. Previously considered a subspecies of Danaus chrysippus, this species came about through allopatric speciation. The deep sea barrier called Lydekker's Line, located by the Molluccas and the Sahul Shelf, was what separated Danaus petilia from Danaus chrysippus cratippus. Its caterpillars feed on native and introduced cotton bush species.

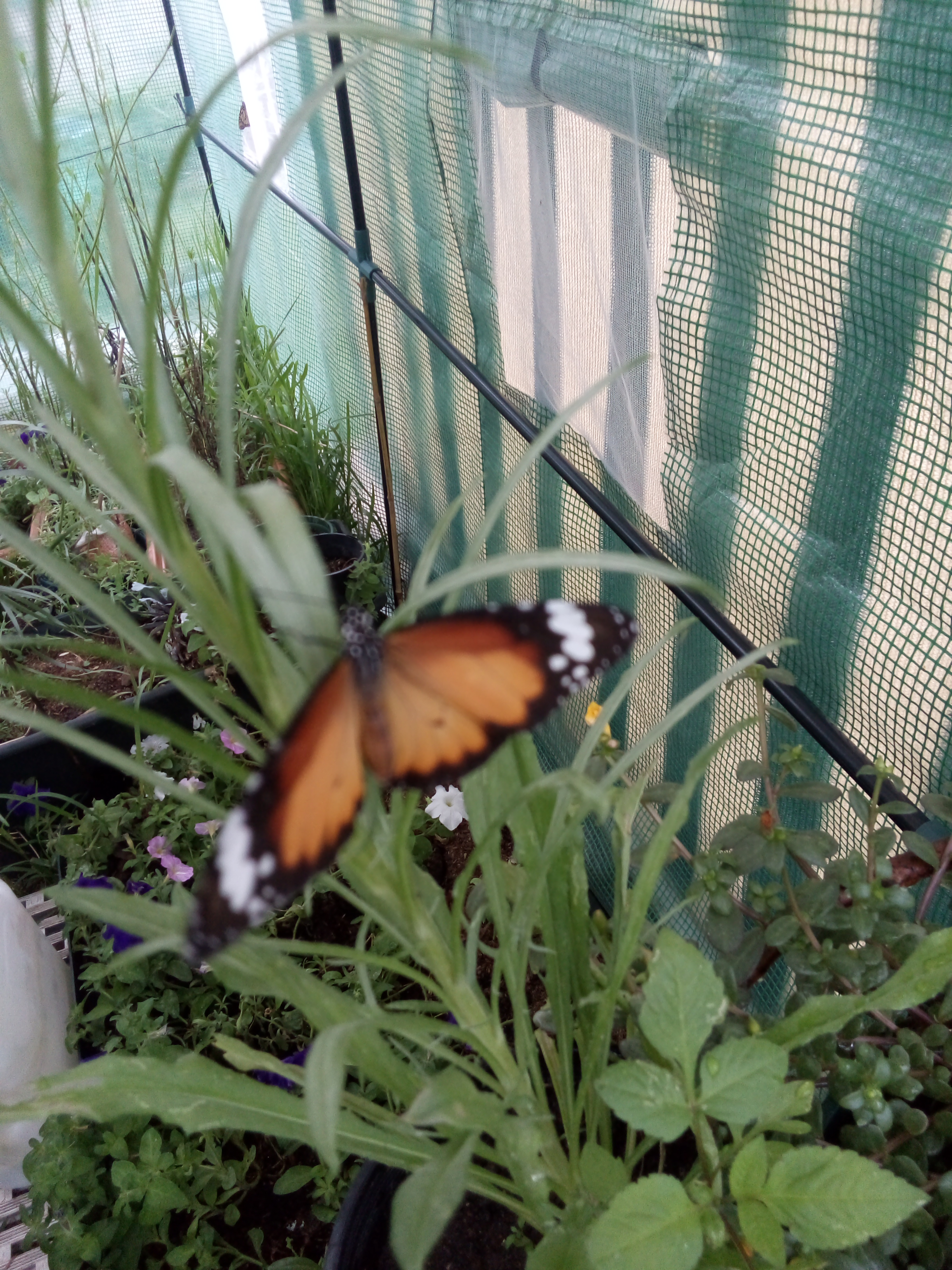

A common butterfly with nomadic populations, particularly in Central Australia where many native host plants die off during dry periods, and in South Eastern Australia where it is too cold for them in winter. Butterflies prefer an open country or farmland habitat. Flight is generally slow and close to the ground.

== Host plants ==
Host plants include of a range of native and introduced plants that have a milky sap like Gomphocarpus, Cynanchum, Secamone, Marsdenia, Ascelpias, Calotropis, Stapelia and many more.
