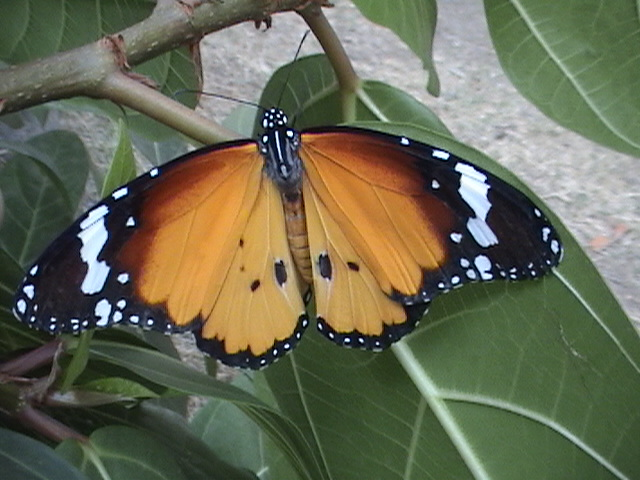
- Male Danaus chrysippus
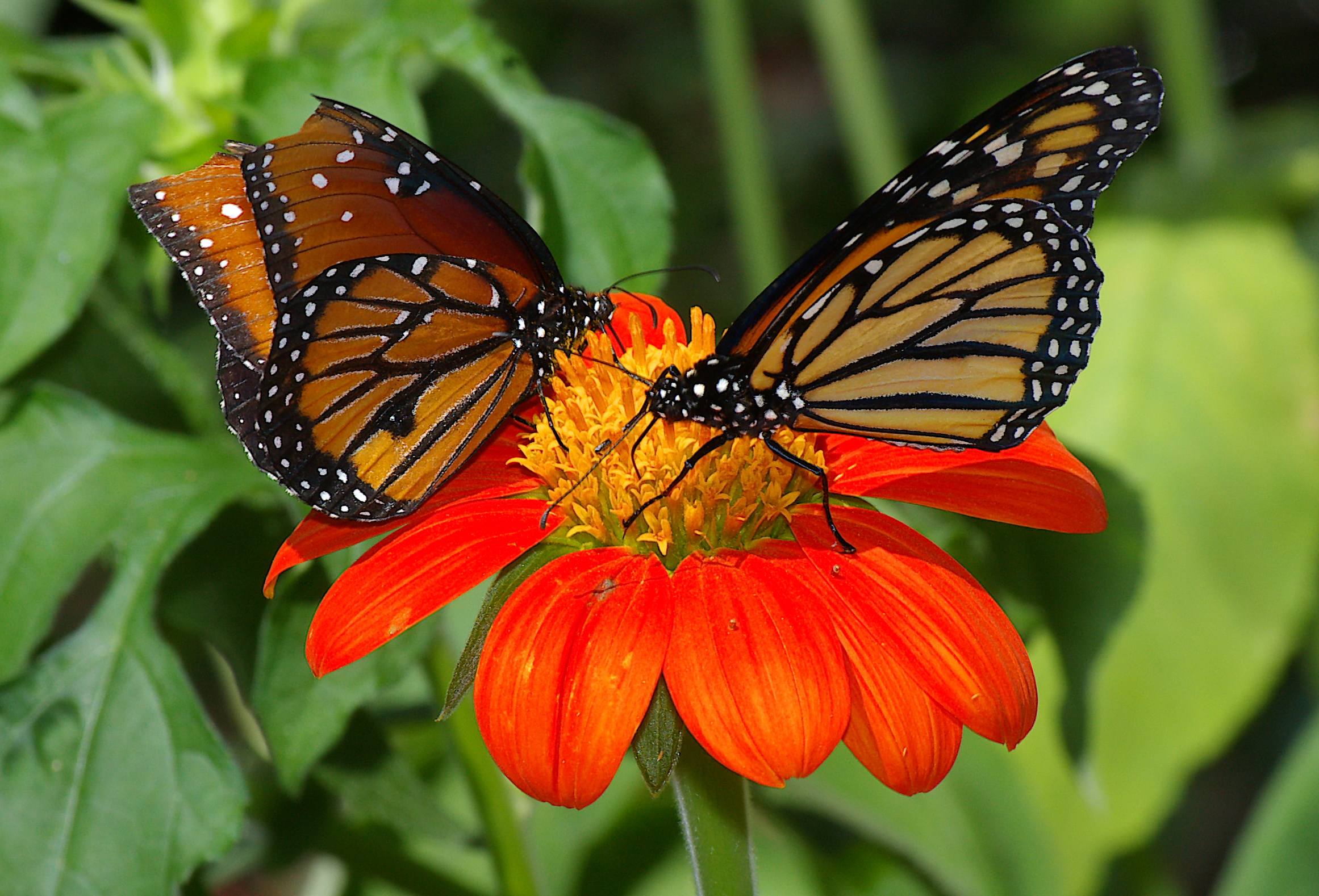
- Danaus plexippus and Danaus gilippus

Scientific classification
- Kingdom: Animalia
- Phylum: Arthropoda
- Clade: Pancrustacea
- Class: Insecta
- Order: Lepidoptera
- Family: Nymphalidae
- Subtribe: Danaina
- Genus: Danaus; Kluk, 1802

Type species
- Papilio plexippus Linnaeus, 1758

Species
- 12–13 species, see text

= Danaus (butterfly) =

Genus of brush-footed butterflies

Danaus, commonly called tigers, milkweeds, monarchs, wanderers, and queens, is a genus of butterflies in the tiger butterfly tribe. They are found worldwide, including North America, South America, Africa, Asia, and Oceania. For other tigers see the genus, Parantica.

Distribution Map of Danaus from iNaturalist observed in 2026

== Pollination ==
All species of Danaus are pollinators, however it is not on purpose. Like other butterfly species, Danaus forage nectar from plants. While foraging for nectar on plants, pollen grains may stick onto different parts of the butterfly, such as the proboscis, head, thorax, legs and wings. This allows transfer of pollen from one plant to another, allowing pollination to occur.

Pollination can be species-specific, as foraging of nectar can require specific nutrients from plants. Danaus pollinate many different plant families, however, most commonly found to pollinate Asteraceae. Other plant families Danaus also visit are Fabaceae, Cleomaceae, Euphorbiaceae, Lamiaceae, Malvaceae and Zygophyllaceae. However, these are more species specific compared to that of Asteraceae.

They are important pollinators to many species of plants, for example, Danaus chrysippus is a significant pollinator for Helianthus debilis due to longer foraging times compared to that of other pollinators. This is significant as longer contact shows a better pollination quality.

== Conservation ==
Conservation of Danaus have been established in plant nurseries to ensure the increase of species population. Such as planting milkweed plant species (Asclepias) along migratory paths of Danaus butterflies. For all Danaus species, conservation is understanding the lifecycle, this is to ensure the essential resources needed egg, larval and adult stages. Targeting plants that are essential to Danaus species and re-establishing them in habitats has shown to have a positive impact to Danaus. Such as planting host plants for eggs to be laid and for larvae to feed on.

== Taxonomy ==
Following the review of Smith et al. (2005), 12 species are provisionally accepted based on morphological, mtDNA 12S rRNA and cytochrome c oxidase subunit I, and nuclear DNA 18S rRNA and EF1 subunit α sequence data:

Butterfly	Caterpillar	Name	Common name	Distribution
		Danaus affinis (Fabricius, 1775)	swamp tiger	from Thailand to the Philippines and southwards through Indonesia to Melanesia and northeastern Australia
		Danaus chrysippus (Linnaeus, 1758)	plain tiger, wanderer, African monarch, or African queen	Asia, Australia, and Africa
		Danaus cleophile (Godart, 1819)	Jamaican monarch	Dominican Republic, Haiti, and Jamaica.
		Danaus dorippus (Klug, 1845)	dorippus tiger (formerly included in D. chrysippus)	eastern and southern Africa (mainly in Kenya, Uganda, Erythrea, Oman, Tanzania) and sporadically in India
		Danaus eresimus (Cramer, [1777])	soldier or tropical queen, includes D. plexaure	America: southern Florida, southern Texas, Mexico, the Caribbean, Central America, and South America.
		Danaus erippus (Cramer, [1775])	southern monarch	South America, mainly in Brazil, Uruguay, Paraguay, Argentina, Bolivia, Chile, and southern Peru.
		Danaus genutia (Cramer, [1779])	common tiger, Indian monarch, or orange tiger	Sri Lanka, Myanmar and extending to South-East Asia and Australia (except New Guinea).
		Danaus gilippus (Cramer, [1775])	queen	America: from central United States (Kansas, Colorado, and Utah) to Argentina
		Danaus ismare (Cramer, [1780])	Ismare tiger	South East Asia
		Danaus melanippus (Cramer, [1777])	white tiger, or eastern common tiger	Asia: Assam in eastern India through South-East Asia south to Indonesia, and eastwards to the Philippines and through southern China to Taiwan.
		Danaus petilia (Stoll, 1790)	lesser wanderer	Australia
		Danaus plexippus (Linnaeus, 1758)	monarch	from southern Canada through northern South America. Bermuda, Cook Islands, Hawaii, Cuba, and other Caribbean islands, the Solomons, New Caledonia, New Zealand, Papua New Guinea, Australia, the Azores, the Canary Islands, Gibraltar, the Philippines, and North Africa.

This genus was formerly split into the subgenera Danaus, Salatura, and Anosia, but this arrangement has been abolished. While the first (the 2–3 monarch butterflies) and Salatura (species ismare, genutia, affinis, and melanippus) do indeed seem to be clades, the relationship of these to the other species, especially the puzzling D. dorippus, is not clear.

Hybridization producing fertile offspring is known to occur between some species, confounding mtDNA data; this seems to be especially true in the case of D. dorippus (Smith et al. 2005). In addition, male-killing Spiroplasma infection has been shown in D. chrysippus and probably also occurs in other species (Jiggins et al. 2000); the consequences for speciation and evolution are probably similar to those observed in infection with male-killing strains of the better-researched Wolbachia bacteria.

== Phylogeny ==
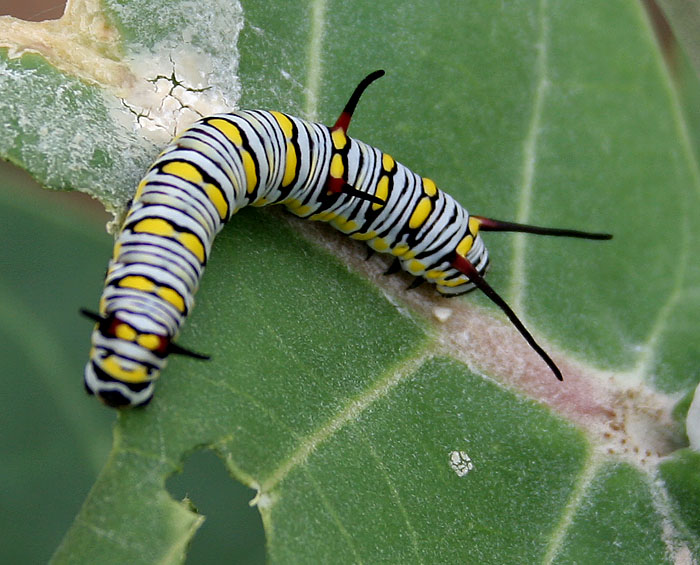
Plain tiger (Danaus chrysippus) caterpillar on a milkweed (Calotropis) species in Hyderabad, India

- Tirumala septentrionis
- Tirumala limniace
- - - Danaus plexippus
    - Danaus erippus
  - - - Danaus genutia
      - - Danaus melanippus
        - Danaus affinis
    - Danaus ismare
  - - Danaus eresimus
    - Danaus gilippus
  - - Danaus petilia
    - - - Danaus dorippus dorippus-2
        - Danaus d. bataviana
      - - Danaus chrysippus chrysippus
        - Danaus c. orientis
        - Danaus c. alcippus
  - Danaus d. dorippus-1

Phylogeny of the genus (without D. cleophile).

== Synonyms of Danaus species and subspecies ==
- Source: The higher classification of Nymphalidae, at Nymphalidae.net
- Note: Names preceded by an equal sign ( = ) are synonyms, homonyms, rejected names, or invalid names. Synonymy, given below in abbreviated form, is from Ackery & Vane-Wright (1984).

Tribe Danaini Boisduval, 1833

- Danaus Kluk, 1802 ( = Danaida Latreille, 1804; = Limnas Hübner, 1806; = Danais Latreille, 1807; = Danaus Latreille, 1809; = Anosia Hübner, 1816; = Festivus Crotch, 1872; = Salatura Moore, 1880; = Nasuma Moore, 1883; = Tasitia Moore, 1883; = Danaomorpha Kremky, 1925; = Panlymnas Bryk, 1937; = Diogas d'Almeida, 1938)
  - Danaus cleophile (Godart, 1819) ( original name = Danais cleophile Godart, 1819)
  - Danaus plexippus (Linnaeus, 1758) ( original name = Papilio plexippus Linnaeus, 1758; = misippiformis Meuschen, 1781; = archippus Fabricius, 1793; = menippe Hübner, 1816; = megalippe Hübner, 1826; = leucogyne Butler, 1884; = fumosus Hulstaert, 1886; = pulchra Strecker, 1900; = nigrippus Haensch, 1909; = americanus Gunder, 1927; = nivosus Gunder, 1927; = curassavicae Fabricius, 1938; = portoriciensis Clark, 1941; = tobagi Clark, 1941; = disjuncta Dufrane, 1948; = bipunctata Dufrane, 1948; = obliterata Dufrane, 1948)
  - Danaus erippus (Cramer, 1775) ( original name = Papilio erippus Cramer, 1775 ( = larensis Köhler, 1929; = asclepiadis Fabricius, 1938)
  - Danaus ismare (Cramer, 1780) ( original name = Papilio ismare Cramer, 1780; = ismareola Butler, 1866; = fulvus Ribbe, 1890; = celebensis Rothschild, 1892; = felicia Fruhstorfer, 1907; = goramica Fruhstorfer, 1907; = alba Morishita, 1981)
  - Danaus genutia (Cramer, 1779) ( original name = Papilio genutia Cramer, 1779; = adnana Swinhoe, 1917; = albipars Talbot, 1943; = alexis Waterhouse & Lyell, 1914; = bandjira Martin, 1911; = bimana Martin, 1911; = connectens Moulton, 1921; = conspicua Butler, 1866; = grynion Fruhstorfer, 1907; = intensa Moore, 1883; = intermedia Moore, 1883; = kyllene Fruhstorfer, 1910; = laratensis Butler, 1883; = leucoglene Felder & Felder, 1865; = niasicus Fruhstorfer, 1899; = nipalensis Moore, 1877; = partita Fruhstorfer, 1897; = plexippus auctt. nec Linnaeus, 1758; = sumatrana Moore, 1883; = sumbana Talbot, 1943; = telmissus Fruhstorfer, 1910; = tuak Pryer & Cator, 1894; = tychius Fruhstorfer, 1910; = uniens Martin, 1911; = wetterensis Fruhstorfer, 1899; = yuchingkini Murayama & Shimonoya, 1960 (hybrid chrysippus x genutia, Kurosawa, 1973)
  - Danaus affinis (Fabricius, 1775) ( original name = Papilio affinis Fabricius, 1775; = abigar Eschscholtz, 1821; = adustus Godman & Salvin, 1882; = affinoides Fruhstorfer, 1899; = albistriga Talbot, 1943; = albonotata Howarth, 1962; = artenice Cramer, 1781; = aruana Moore, 1883; = astakos Fruhstorfer, 1906; = batjana Fruhstorfer, 1899; = bipuncta Talbot, 1943; = biseriata Butler, 1882; = bonguensis Fruhstorfer, 1899; = cecilia Bouganville, 1837; = chionippe Hübner, 1823; = cometho Godman & Salvin, 1888; = coriacea Fruhstorfer, 1906; = decentralis Fruhstorfer, 1899; = decipiens Butler, 1882; = decipientis Strand, 1914; = djampeana Van Eecke, 1915; = fergussonia Fruhstorfer, 1907; = ferruginea Butler, 1876; = fuliginosa Hagen, 1894; = fulgurata Butler, 1866; = fuscata Talbot, 1943; = galacterion Fruhstorfer, 1906; = gelanor Waterhouse & Lyell, 1914; = hegesippinus Röber, 1891; = insolata Butler, 1870; = jimiensis Miller & Miller, 1978; = jobiensis Grose-Smith, 1894; = kapaura Talbot, 1943; = kawiensis Fruhstorfer, 1899; = kiriwina Fruhstorfer, 1907; = leucippis Röber, 1891; = litoralis Doherty, 1891; = luxurians Fruhstorfer, 1907; = malayana Fruhstorfer, 1899; = molyssa Fruhstorfer, 1907; = mysolica Moore, 1883; = mytilene Felder & Felder, 1860; = nigrita Moore, 1883; = nore Swinhoe, 1917; = nubila Butler, 1866; = obscura Capronnier, 1886; = oesypera Talbot, 1943; = olga Swinhoe, 1917; = oros Fruhstorfer, 1907; = paradoxa Röber, 1939; = philene Stoll 1782; = piepersi Kalis, 1933; = pittakus Fruhstorfer, 1907; = pleistarchus Fruhstorfer, 1912; = pseudophilene Fruhstorfer, 1907; = pullata Butler, 1866; = rubrica Fruhstorfer, 1906; = sabrona Talbot, 1943; = sangira Fruhstorfer, 1899; = signata Talbot, 1943; = snelleni Kalis, 1933; = strephon Fruhstorfer, 1907; = subnigra Joicey & Talbot, 1922; = subnubila Fruhstorfer, 1907; = tambora Fruhstorfer, 1899; = taroena Van Eecke, 1915; = taruna Fruhstorfer, 1899; = transfuga Fruhstorfer, 1907; = tualana Talbot, 1943; = vandeldeni Kalis, 1933; = vorkeinus Röber, 1866; = wentholti Martin, 1914; = woodlarkiana Fruhstorfer, 1907)
  - Danaus melanippus (Cramer, 1777) ( original name = Papilio melanippus Cramer, 1777; = hegesippus Cramer, 1777; = lotis Cramer, 1779; = thoe Hübner, 1816; = edmondii Bougainville, 1837; = nesippus C. Felder, 1862; = eurydice Butler, 1884; = celebensis Staudinger, 1889; = erebus, Röber, 1891; = haruhasa Doherty, 1891; = pietersii Doherty, 1891; = taimanu Doherty, 1891; = fruhstorferi Röber, 1897; = keteus Hagen, 1898; = indicus Fruhstorfer, 1899; = malossona Fruhstorfer, 1899; = lotina Fruhstorfer, 1904; = umbrosus Fruhstorfer, 1906; = philozigetes Fruhstorfer, 1907; = mezentius Fruhstorfer, 1910; = meridionigra Martin, 1913; = edwardi Van Eecke, 1914; = insularis Moulton, 1921; = albescens Röber, 1927; = kotoshonis Matsumara, 1929; = camorta Evans, 1932)
  - Danaus eresimus (Cramer, 1777) ( original name = Papilio eresimus Cramer, 1777; = ares d'Almeida, 1944; = asclepidea Fabricius, 1938; = dilucida Forbes, 1939; = erginus Godman & Salvin, 1897; = estevana Talbot, 1943; = icensis Fuchs, 1954; = montezuma Talbot, 1943; = tethys Forbes, 1943)
  - Danaus plexaure (Godart, 1819) ( original name = Danais plexaure Godart, 1819; = brasiliensis Capronnier, 1874)
  - Danaus gilippus (Cramer, 1775) ( original name = Papilio gilippus Cramer, 1775; = berenice Cramer, 1779; = vincedoxici Hübner, 1816; = vincetoxici Hübner, 1816; = cleothera Godart, 1819; = manuja Eschscholtz, 1821; = xanthippus Felder & Felder, 1860; = thersippus Bates, 1863; = jamaicensis Bates, 1864; = strigosa Bates, 1864; = hermippus Felder & Felder, 1865; = nivosus Godman & Salvin, 1897; = esperanza Hoffman, 1924; = centralis Joicey & Talbot, 1925; = kempfferi Hall, 1925; = kerri Comstock, 1925; = vincetoxici Fabricius, 1938; = candidus Clark, 1941; = gilippina Hoffman, 1940; = wheeleri Talbot, 1943; = roedingeri Fuchs, 1954)
  - Danaus chrysippus (Linnaeus, 1758) ( original name = Papilio chrysippus Linnaeus, 1758; = albinus Lanz, 1896; = amplifascia Talbot, 1943; = anomala Dufrane, 1948; = asclepiadis Gagliardi, 1811; = auriflava Van Eecke, 1914; = axantha Hayward, 1922; = bataviana Moore, 1883; = bipunctata Dufrane, 1948; = bowringi Moore, 1883; = candidata Hayward, 1922; = chrysipellus Strand, 1910; = clarippus Weymer, 1884; = completa Dufrane, 1948; = cratippus Felder, 1860; = deficiens Dufrane, 1948; = duplicata Dufrane, 1948; = duponti Dufrane, 1948; = evanescens Storace, 1949; = fuscippus Van Eecke, 1915; = gelderi Snellen, 1891; = hanoiensis Dufrane, 1948; = hypermnestra Stoneham, 1958; = impunctata Dufrane, 1948; = infumata Aurivillius, 1898; = joannisi Dufrane, 1948; = kanariensis Fruhstorfer, 1898; = lemeemagdalenae Lemeé, 1950; = limbata Matsumura, 1929; = luxurians Dufrane, 1948; = margarita Röber, 1926; = orientis Aurivillius, 1909; = ornata Dufrane, 1948; = petilia Stoll, 1790; = praealbata Froreich, 1928; = pseudopetilea Kalis, 1933; = radiata Dufrane, 1948; = reducta Dufrane, 1948; = rubra Van Eecke, 1915; = semialbinus Strand, 1910; = subpurpurea Matsumura, 1929; = subreducta Dufrane, 1948; = vigelii Heylaerts, 1884; = witteellus Overlaet, 1955; = yuchingkini Murayama & Shimonoya, 1960 (hybrid D. chrysippus x D. genutia)
    - Danaus chrysippus chrysippus (Linnaeus, 1758)
    - Danaus chrysippus aegyptius (Schreber, 1759) ( original name = Papilio aegyptius Schreber, 1759; = Danaus chrysippus klugii Butler, 1886; = Papilio alcippus Cramer, 1777; = Danaus chrysippus liboria Hulstaert, 1931; = Danaus chrysippus alcippoides Moore, 1883; = Danaus chrysippus dorippus Klug, 1845; = Danaus chrysippus transiens Suffert, 1900)
