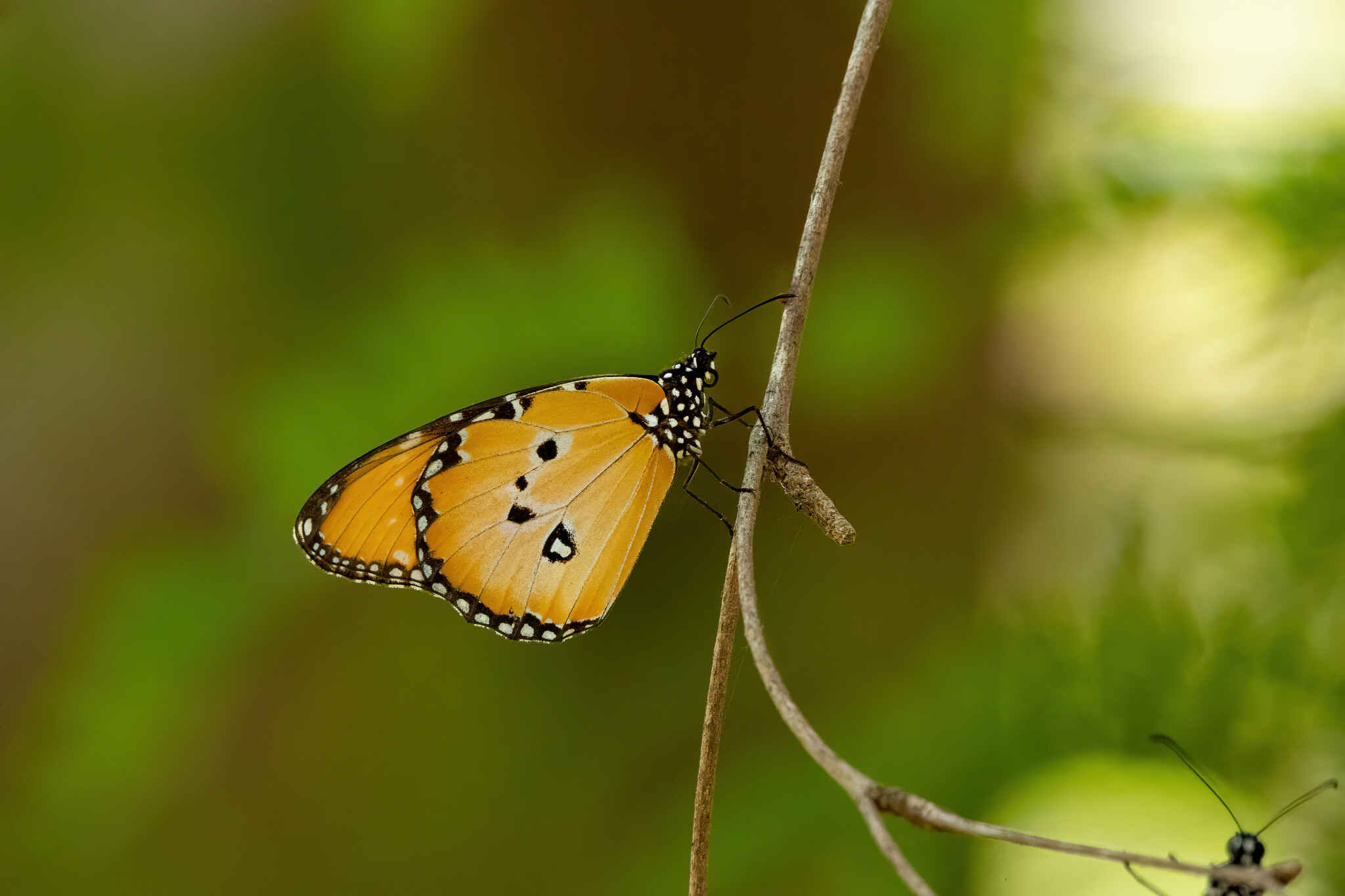

Scientific classification
- Kingdom: Animalia
- Phylum: Arthropoda
- Class: Insecta
- Order: Lepidoptera
- Family: Nymphalidae
- Genus: Danaus
- Species: D. dorippus

Binomial name
- Danaus dorippus (Klug, 1845)

Synonyms
- Euploea dorippus Klug, 1845; Limnas dorippus; Danaus chrysippus aegyptius f. dorippus; Danaus (Anosia) chrysippus f. dorippus; Danaus chrysippus dorippus; Limnas klugii Butler, 1886; Danaus chrysippus dorippus ab. evanescens Storace, 1949

= Danaus dorippus =

Dorippus tiger

Species of butterfly

Danaus dorippus, the dorippus tiger, is a butterfly belonging to the danaine group of the brush-footed butterflies family.

== Systematics and taxonomy ==
Danaus dorippus was formerly regarded as a subspecies of Danaus chrysippus, the plain tiger or African monarch. It is now regarded as a distinct species. It appears (from analysis of mtDNA sequences, which are only inherited from the mother) that the dorippus tiger is the product of an ancient lineage of Danaus hybridizing with plain tiger females. As the plain tiger is known to be parasitized at least occasionally by Spiroplasma bacteria which selectively kill off male hosts, a subsequent scarcity of plain tiger males might have led to this hybridization and the evolution of the dorippus tiger. From the color pattern of this species, it can be assumed that the ancient lineage had no black apex on the forewings, as this character is still absent in D. dorippus.

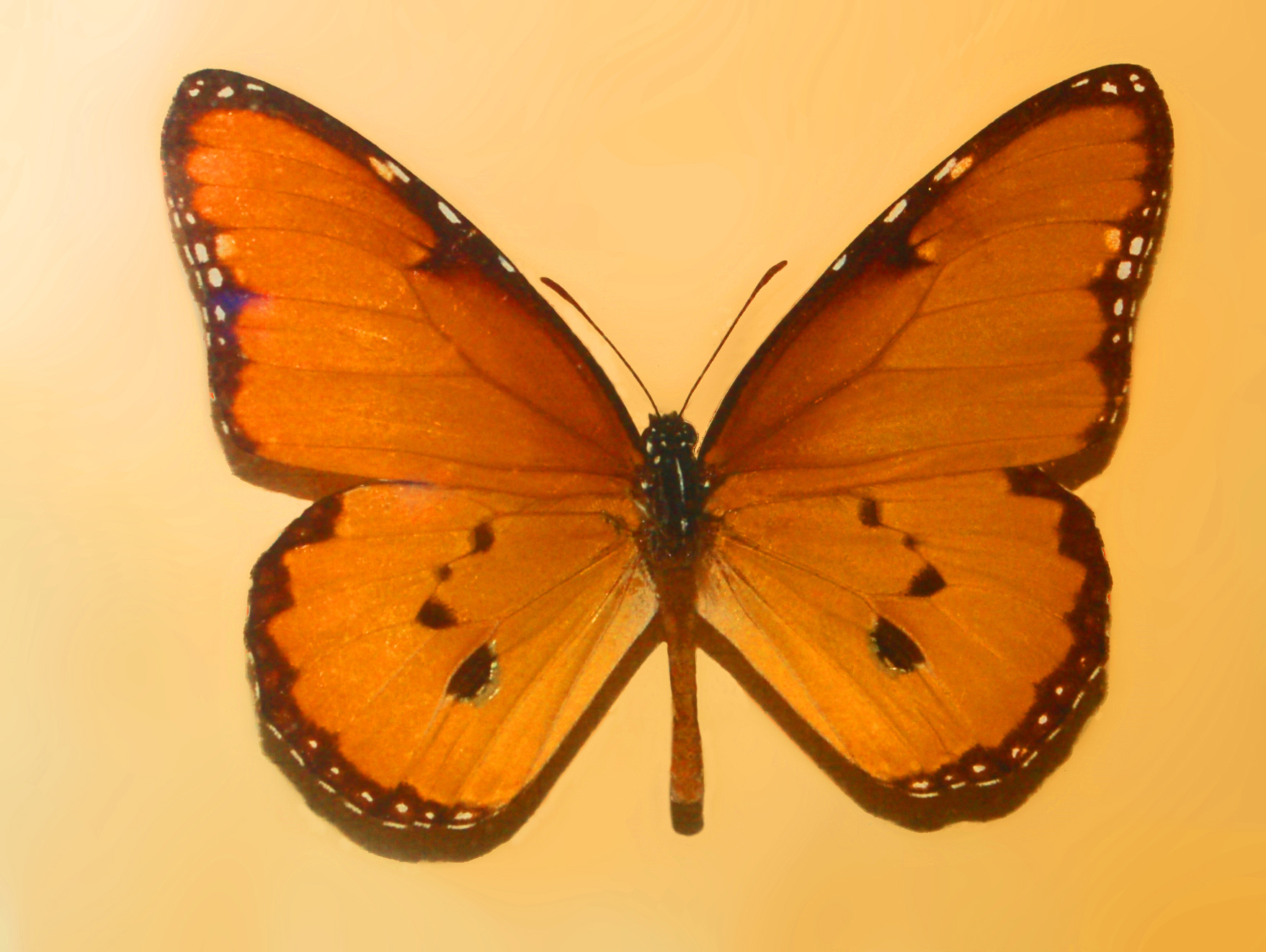
Danaus dorippus from Eritrea, mounted specimen

== Description ==
Danaus dorippus is a medium-sized butterfly with a wingspan of about 60–80 millimetres (2.4–3.1 in). The body is black with a few white spots. The wings are tawny and have a thin border of black enclosing a series of semicircular white spots. The hindwing has three or four black spots around the center.

This species is mimicked (Batesian mimicry) by the females of Hypolimnas misippus, form inaria, that has orange forewing tip with white spotting.

== Distribution ==
This species can be found in eastern and southern Africa (mainly in Kenya, Uganda, Eritrea, Oman, Tanzania) and sporadically in India.
