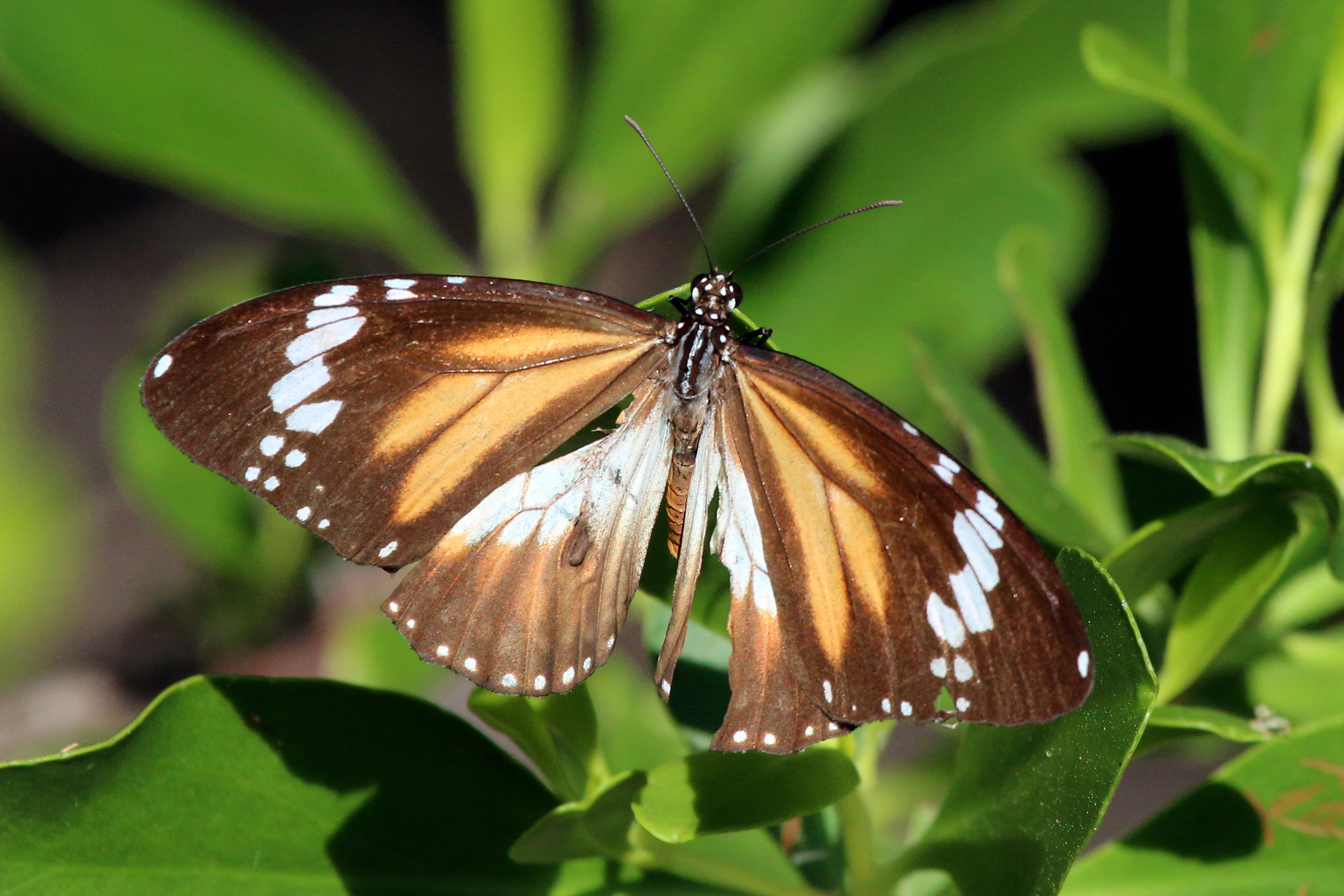
- D. a. fulgurata dorsal view from Indonesia
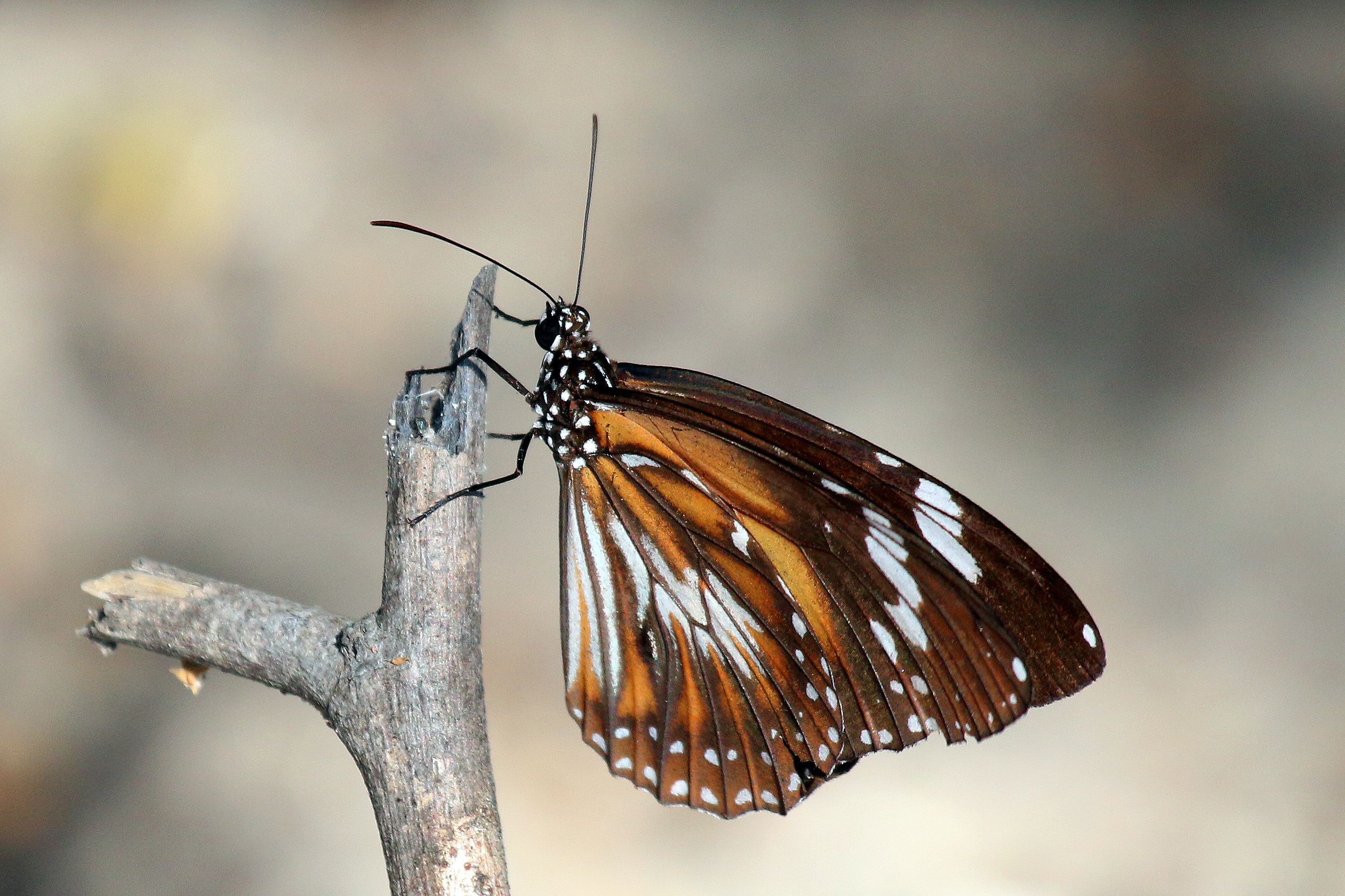
- D. a. fulgurata ventral view from Indonesia

Scientific classification
- Kingdom: Animalia
- Phylum: Arthropoda
- Clade: Pancrustacea
- Class: Insecta
- Order: Lepidoptera
- Family: Nymphalidae
- Genus: Danaus
- Species: D. affinis

Binomial name
- Danaus affinis Fabricius, 1775

= Danaus affinis =

Mangrove tiger

Species of butterfly

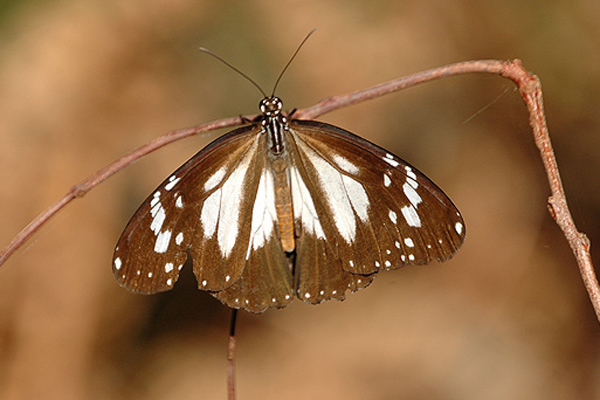
Swamp tiger, Bribie Island, south-east Queensland, Australia

Danaus affinis, the Malay tiger, mangrove tiger or swamp tiger, is a butterfly found in tropical Asia. It belongs to the "crows and tigers", the danaine group of the brush-footed butterflies family.

This is a highly variable species. In its range, which stretches from Thailand to the Philippines and southwards through Indonesia to Melanesia and northeastern Australia, it has at least around 30, possibly many more subspecies. Its closest relative is the white tiger, Danaus melanippus. .

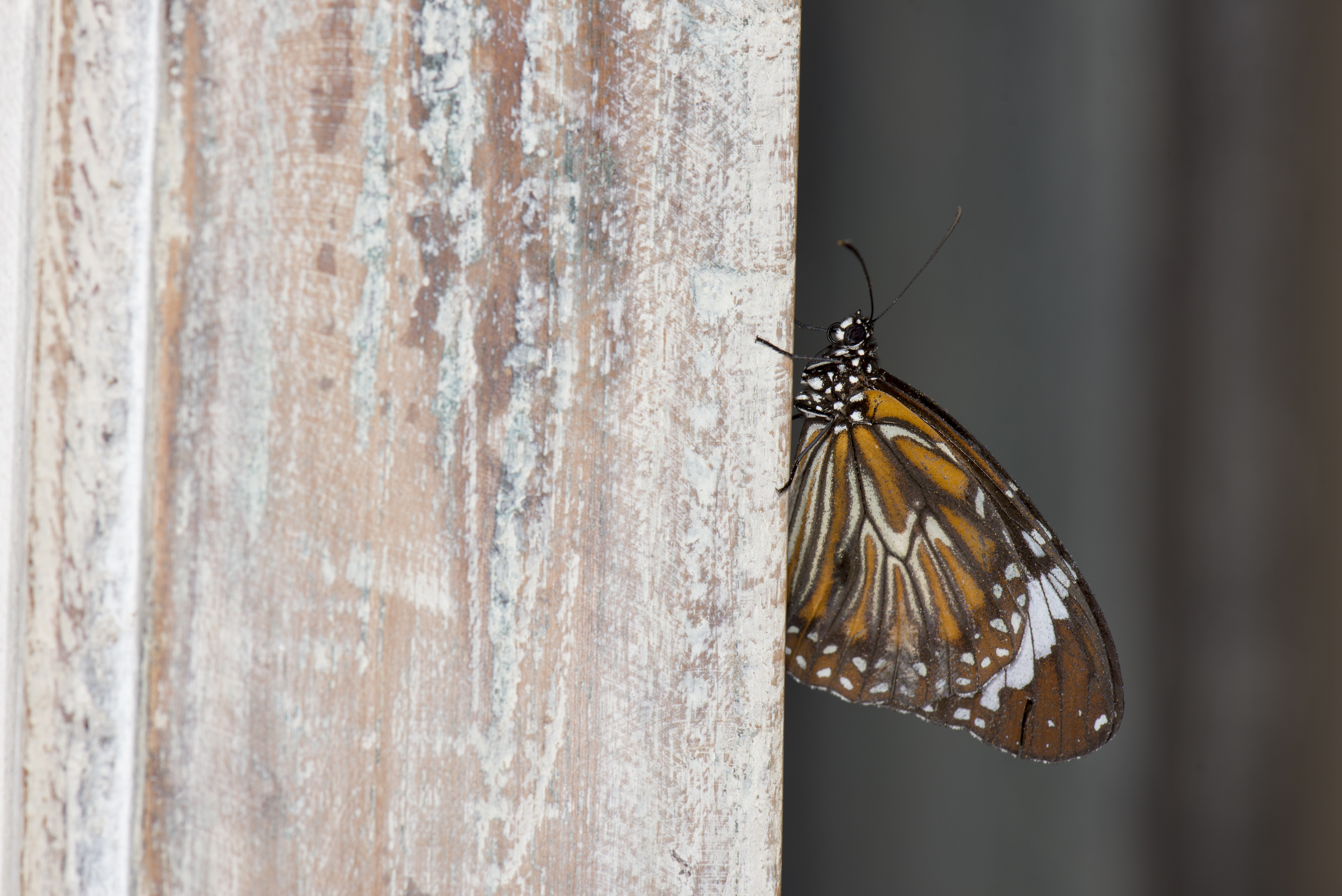
Resting

== See also ==
- Danainae
- Nymphalidae
- List of butterflies of India
- List of butterflies of India (Nymphalidae)
