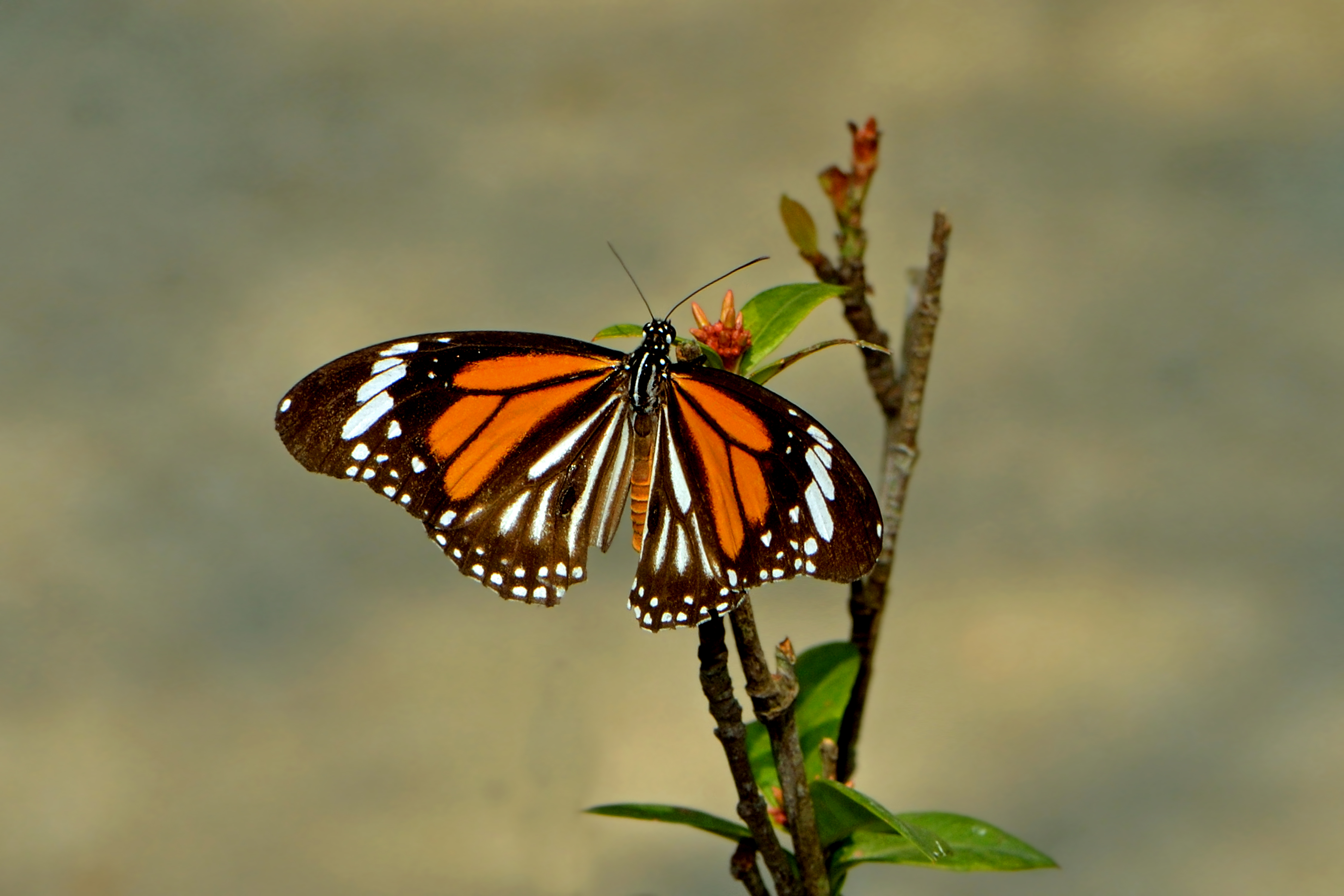
- Topside of D. m. indicus

Scientific classification
- Kingdom: Animalia
- Phylum: Arthropoda
- Clade: Pancrustacea
- Class: Insecta
- Order: Lepidoptera
- Family: Nymphalidae
- Genus: Danaus
- Species: D. melanippus

Binomial name
- Danaus melanippus (Cramer, [1777])

Subspecies
- See text

= Danaus melanippus =

Black veined tiger

Species of butterfly

Danaus melanippus, the black veined tiger, white tiger, common tiger, or eastern common tiger, is a butterfly species found in tropical Asia which belongs to the "crows and tigers", that is, the danaine group of the brush-footed butterflies family.

It ranges from Assam in eastern India through South-East Asia south to Indonesia, and eastwards to the Philippines and through southern China to Taiwan. It has around 17 subspecies, and its closest relative is the Malay tiger, Danaus affinis. .

== Gallery ==
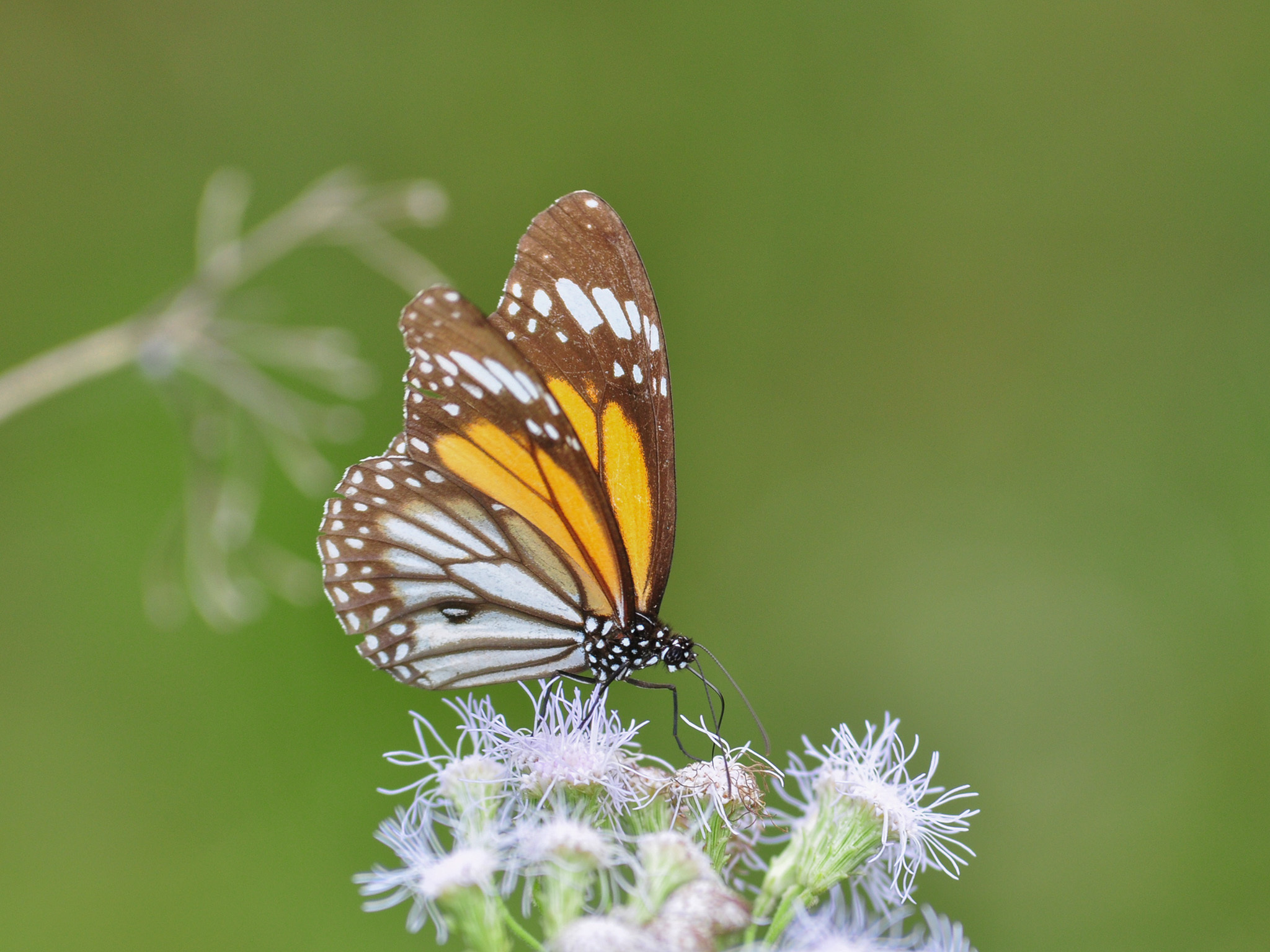

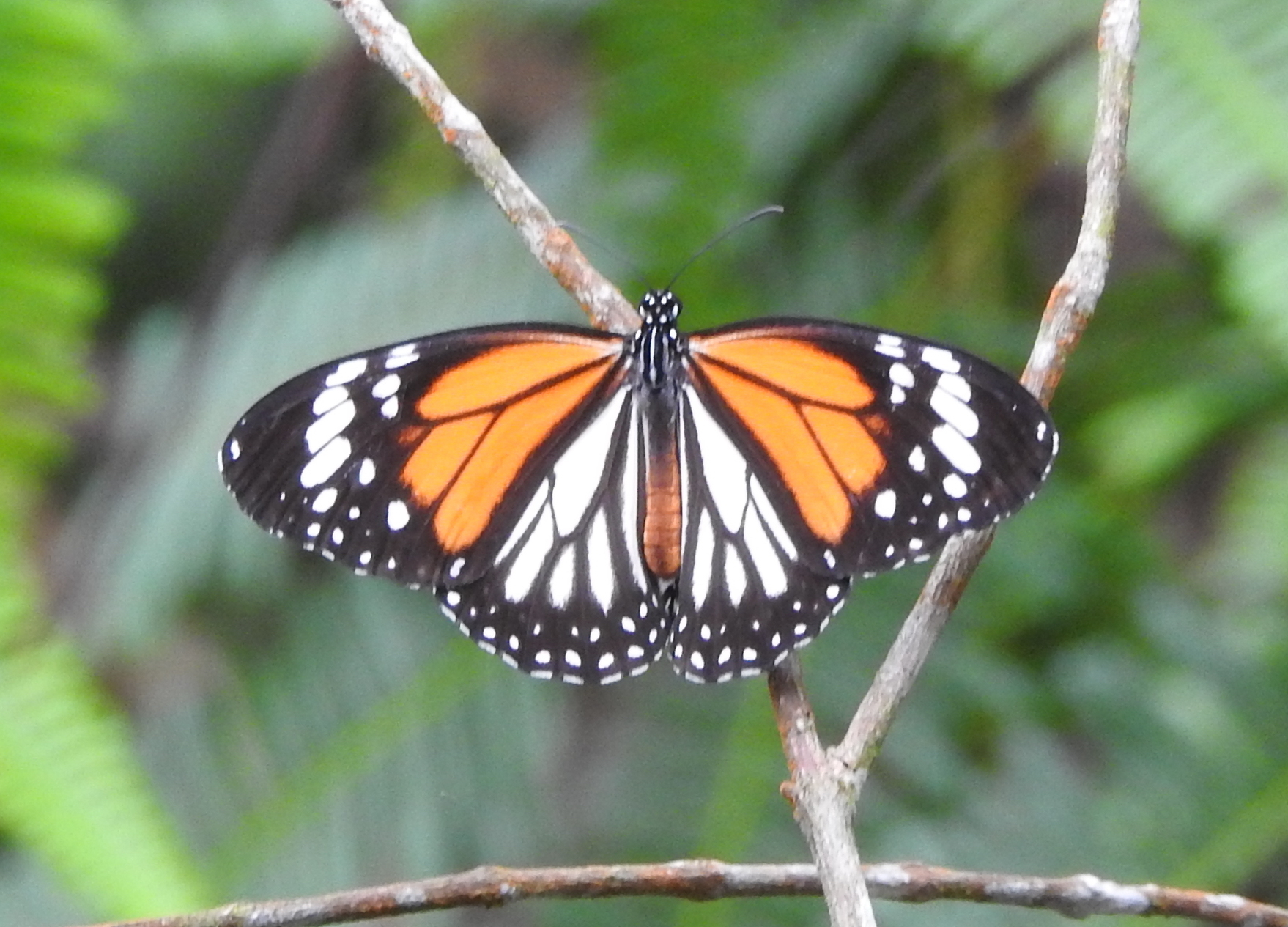

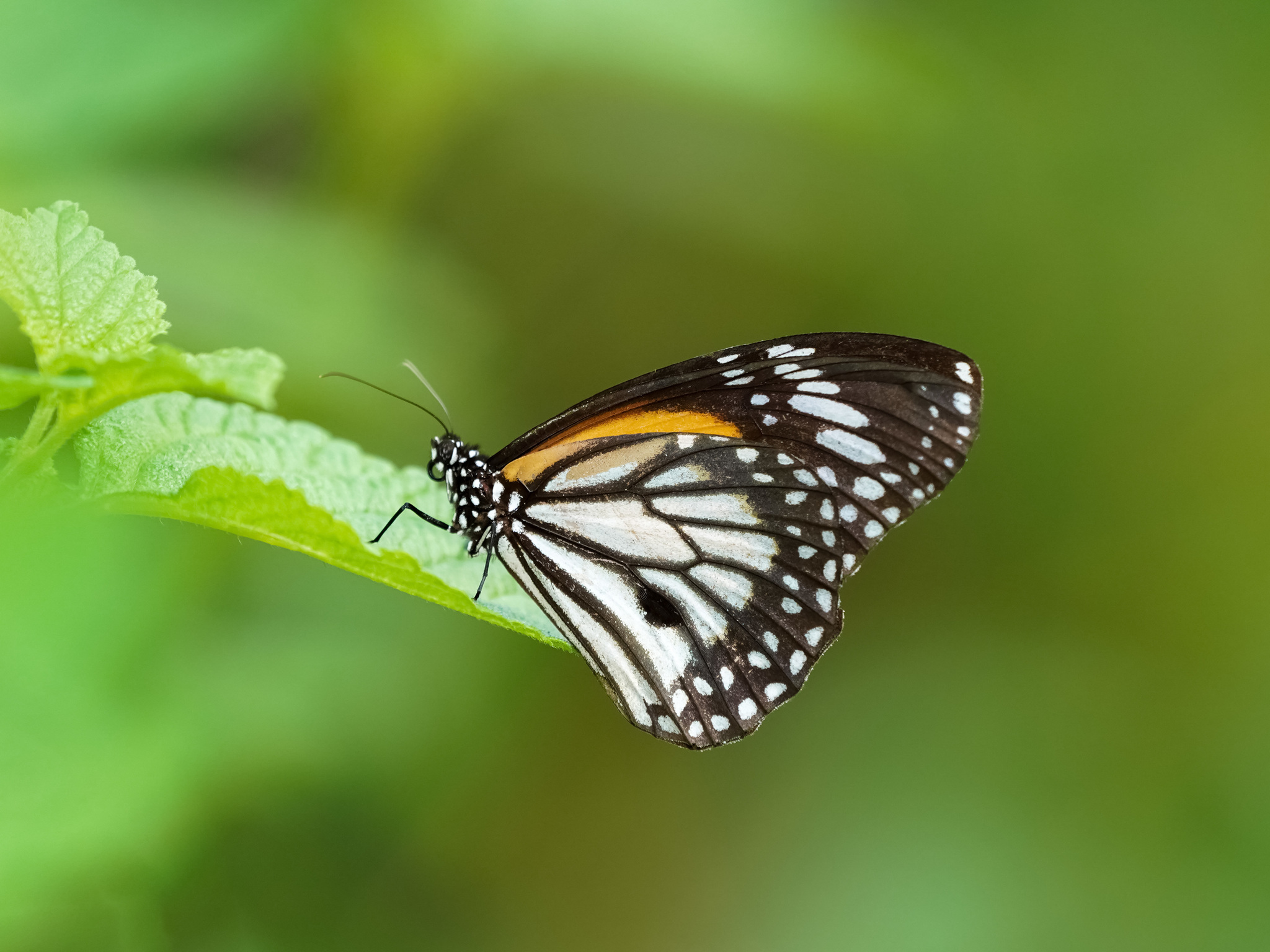

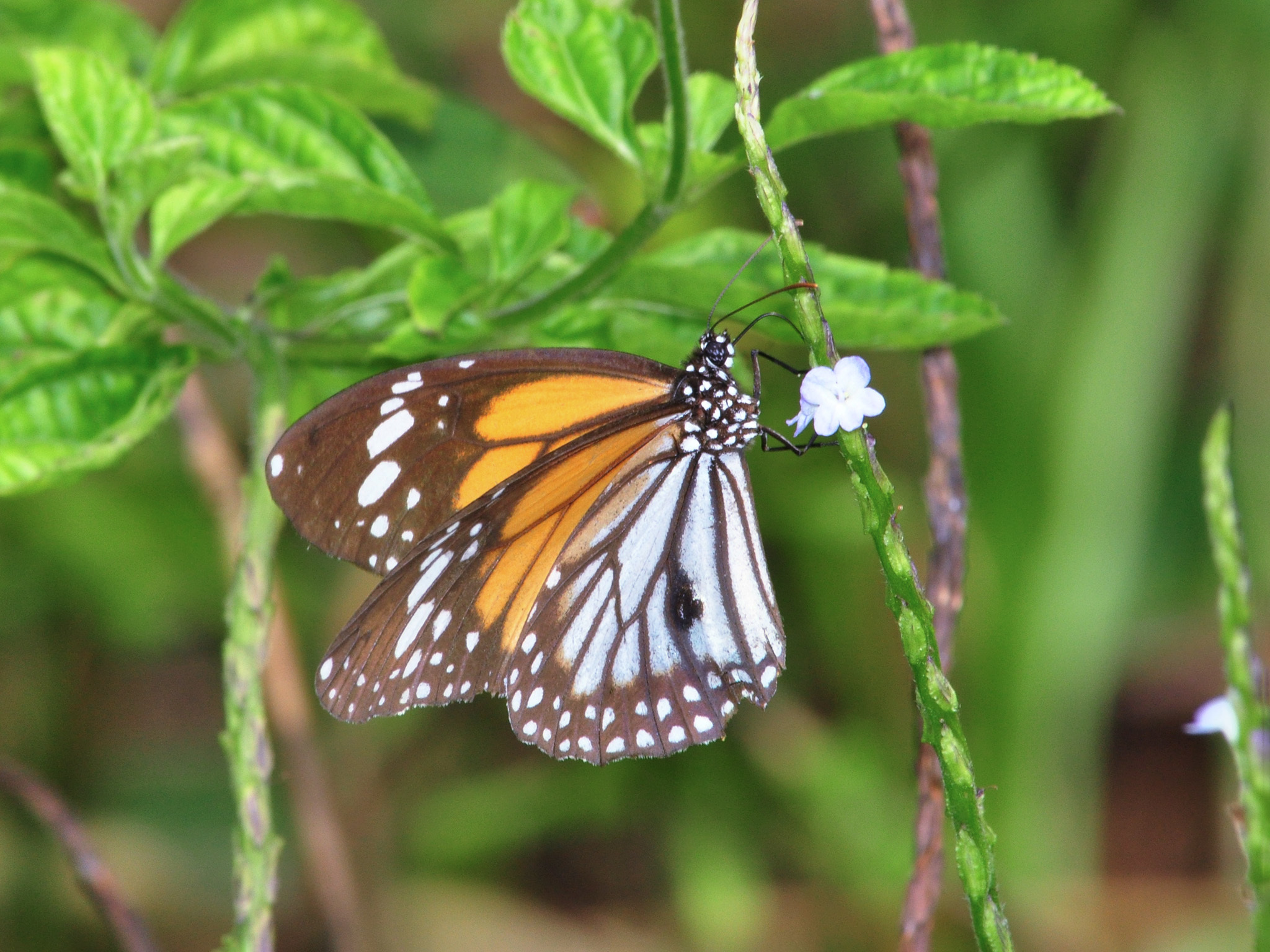

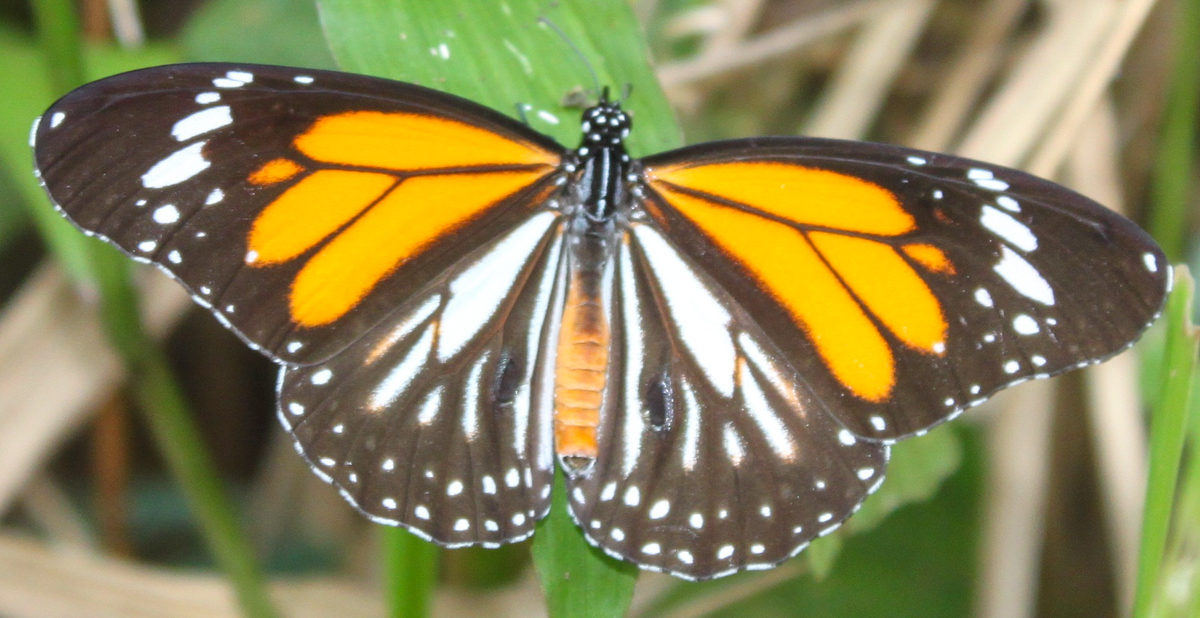
D. m. hegesippus upperside

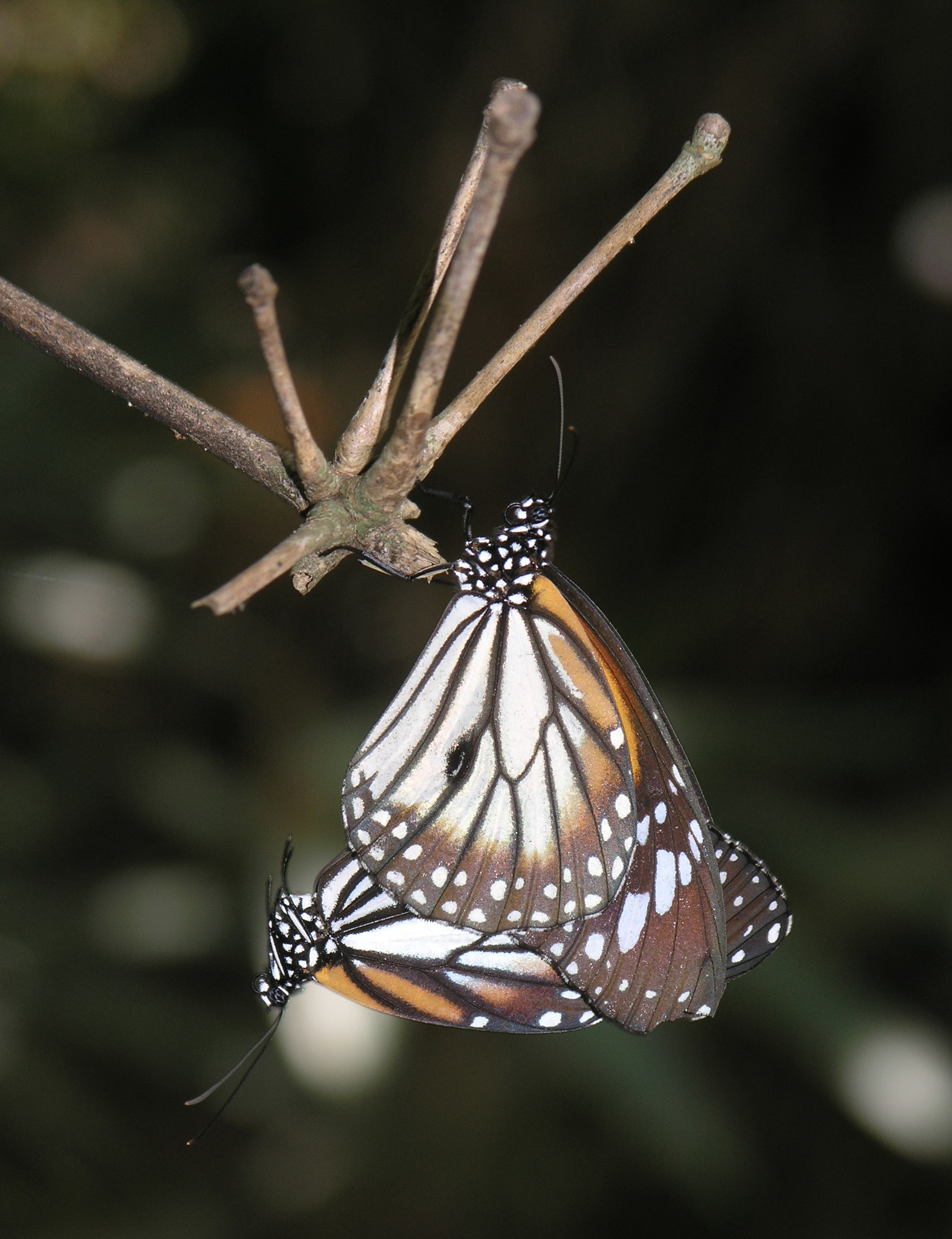
D. m. hegesippus underside

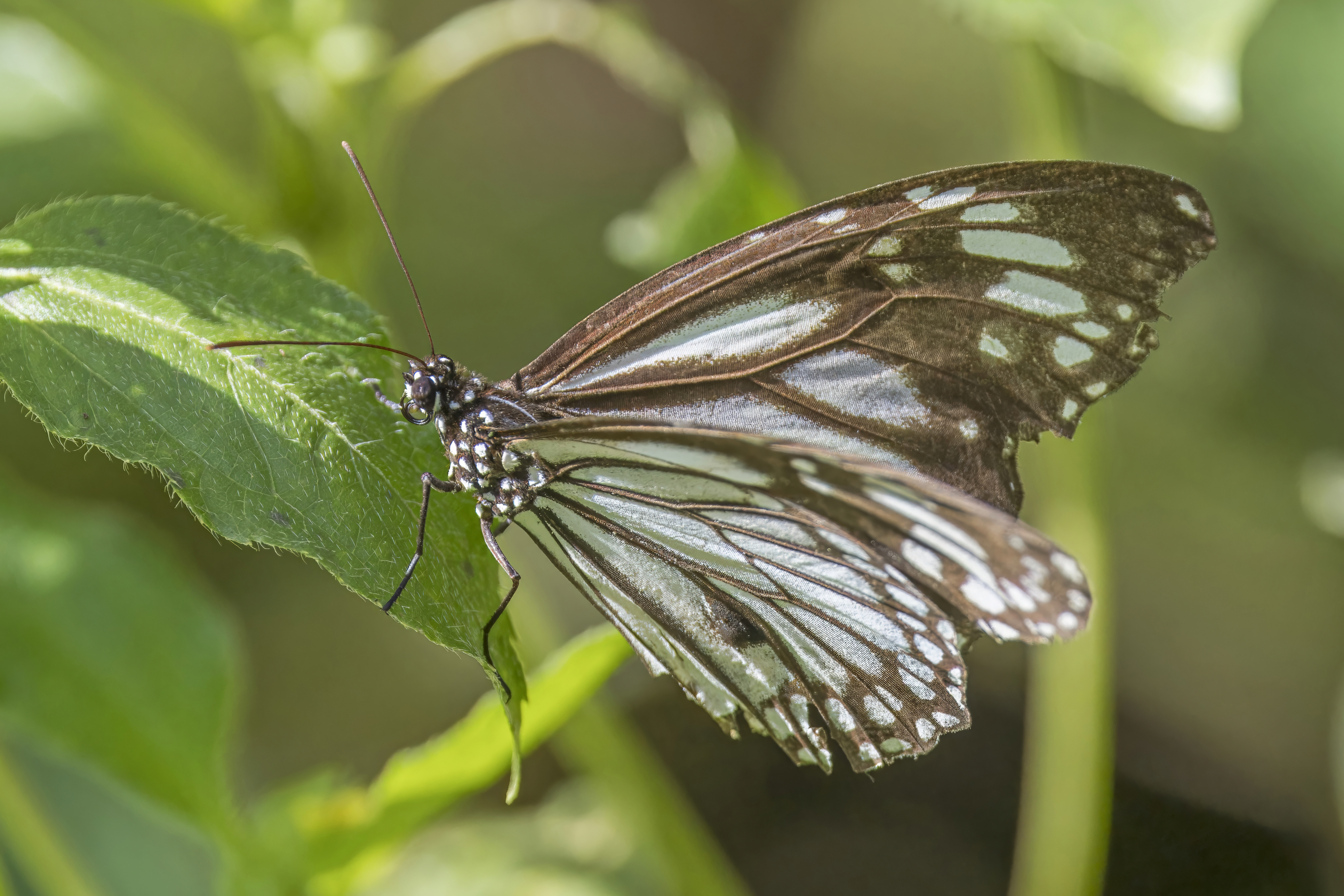
D. m. edmondii, upperside Bohol

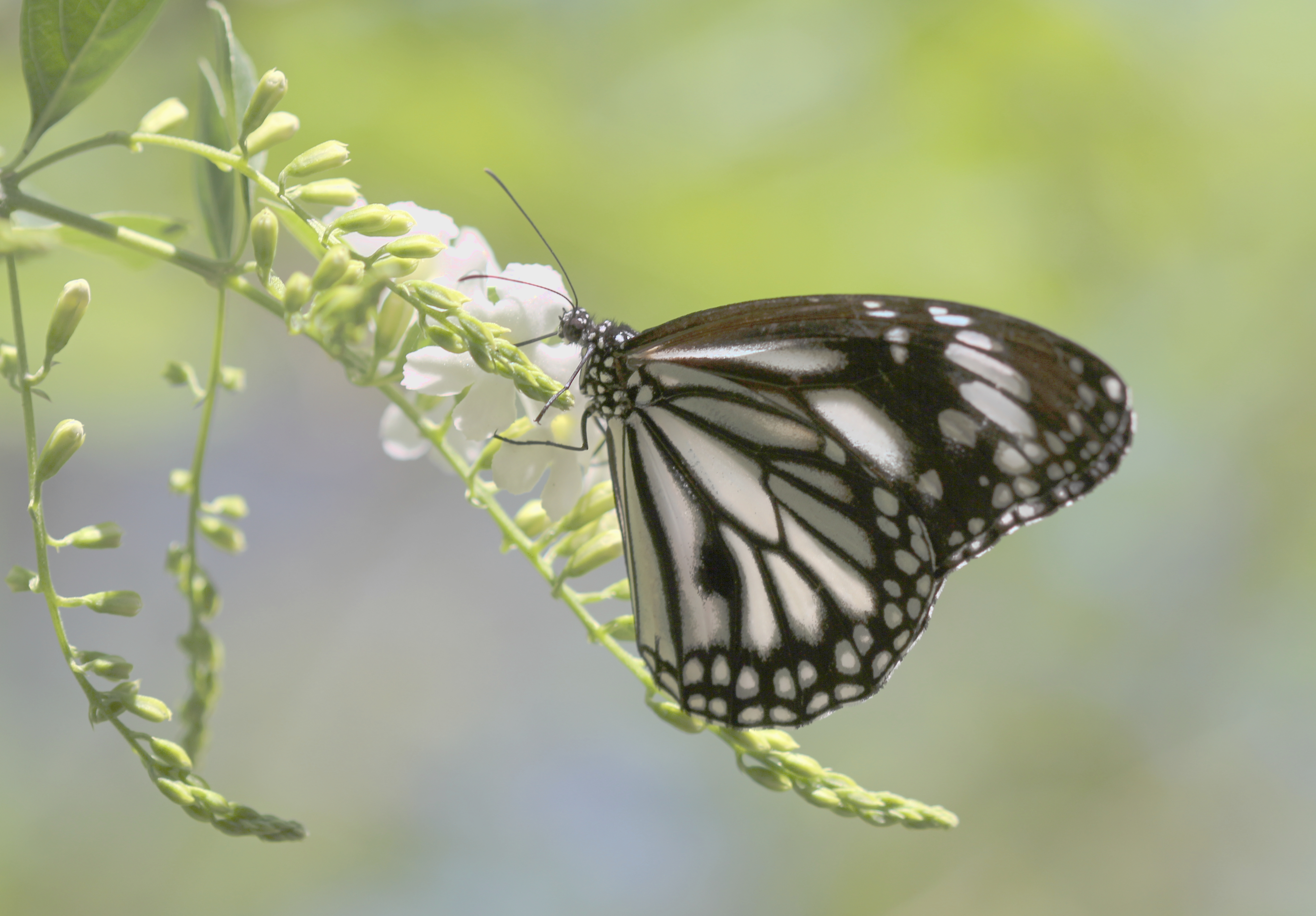
D. m. edmondii, underside, Bohol

== Subspecies ==
Listed alphabetically:

- D. m. celebensis (Staudinger, 1889) – northern Sulawesi
- D. m. edmondii (Bougainville, 1837) – Philippines
- D. m. edwardi (van Eecke, 1914) – Simeulue
- D. m. eurydice (Butler, 1884) – Nias
- D. m. haruhasa Doherty, 1891 – Sumbawa - Alor
- D. m. hegesippus (Cramer, [1777]) – Peninsular Malaya, Langkawi, Singapore, Sumatra, Bangka, Belitung
- D. m. indicus (Fruhstorfer, 1899) – eastern India - Thailand, Indo-China
- D. m. keteus (Hagen, 1898) – Mentawai
- D. m. kotoshonis Matsumura, 1929 – Taiwan
- D. m. lotina (Fruhstorfer, 1904) – Natuna Island
- D. m. lotis (Cramer, [1779])
- D. m. melanippus (Cramer, [1777]) – Java
- D. m. meridionigra Martin, [1914] – central Sulawesi
- D. m. nesippus (Felder, 1862) – Nicobars
- D. m. pietersi (Doherty, 1891) – Enggano
- D. m. umbrosus Fruhstorfer, 1906 – Pualu Tello

== See also ==
- List of butterflies of India
- List of butterflies of India (Nymphalidae)
