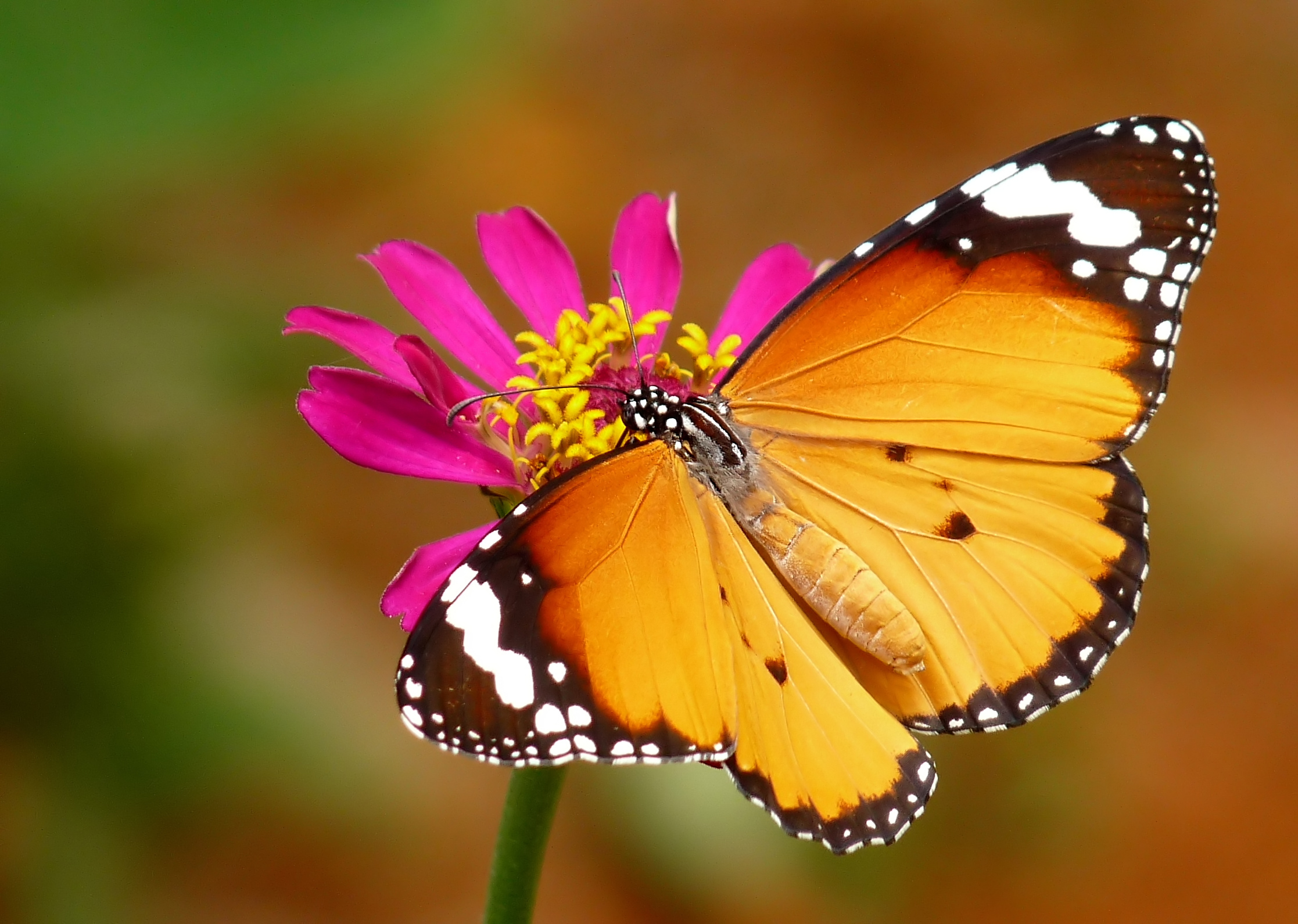
- Upperside
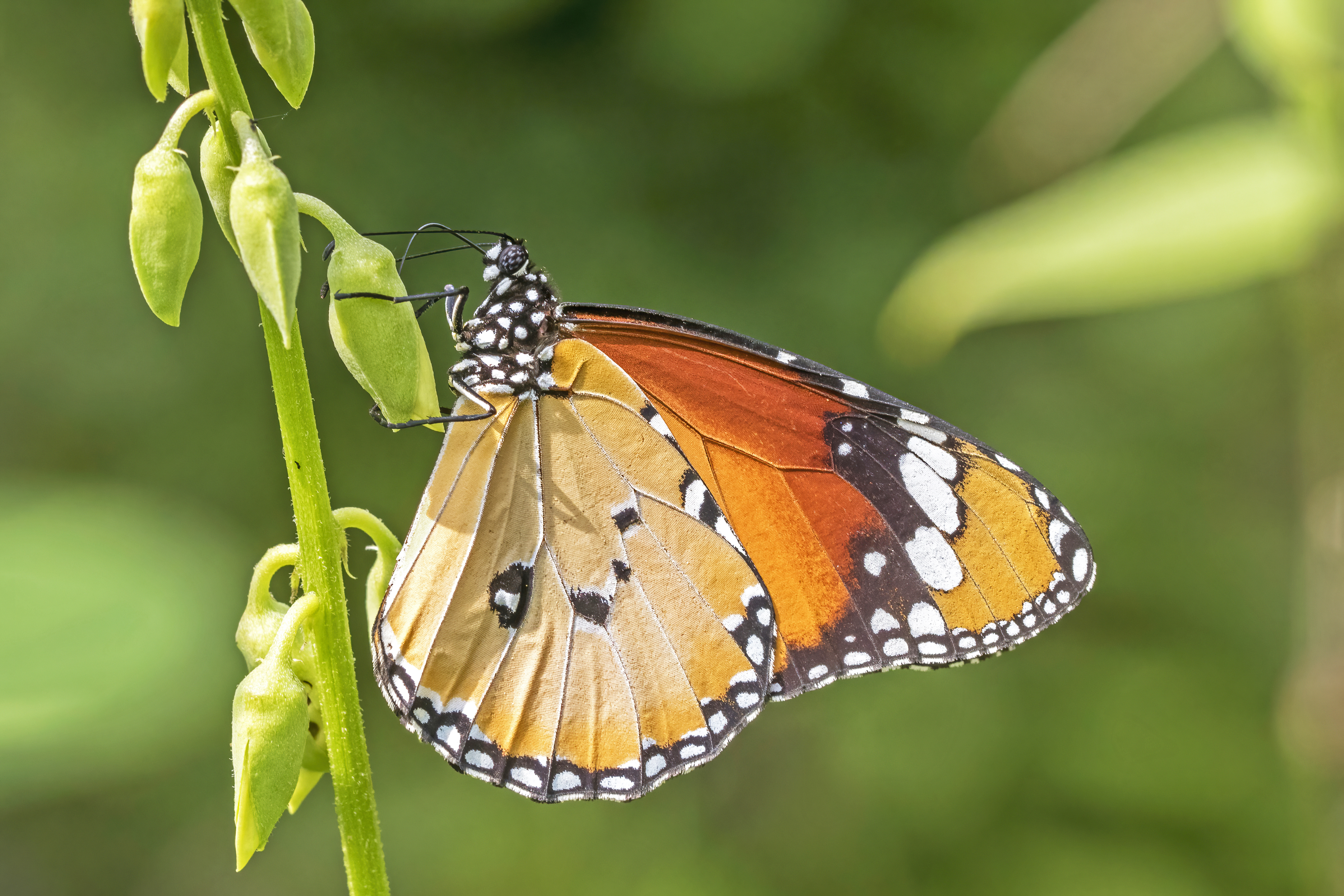
- Male underside both D. c. chrysippus, Kerala, India

Conservation status
- Least Concern (IUCN 3.1)

Scientific classification
- Kingdom: Animalia
- Phylum: Arthropoda
- Clade: Pancrustacea
- Class: Insecta
- Order: Lepidoptera
- Family: Nymphalidae
- Genus: Danaus
- Species: D. chrysippus

Binomial name
- Danaus chrysippus (Linnaeus, 1758)
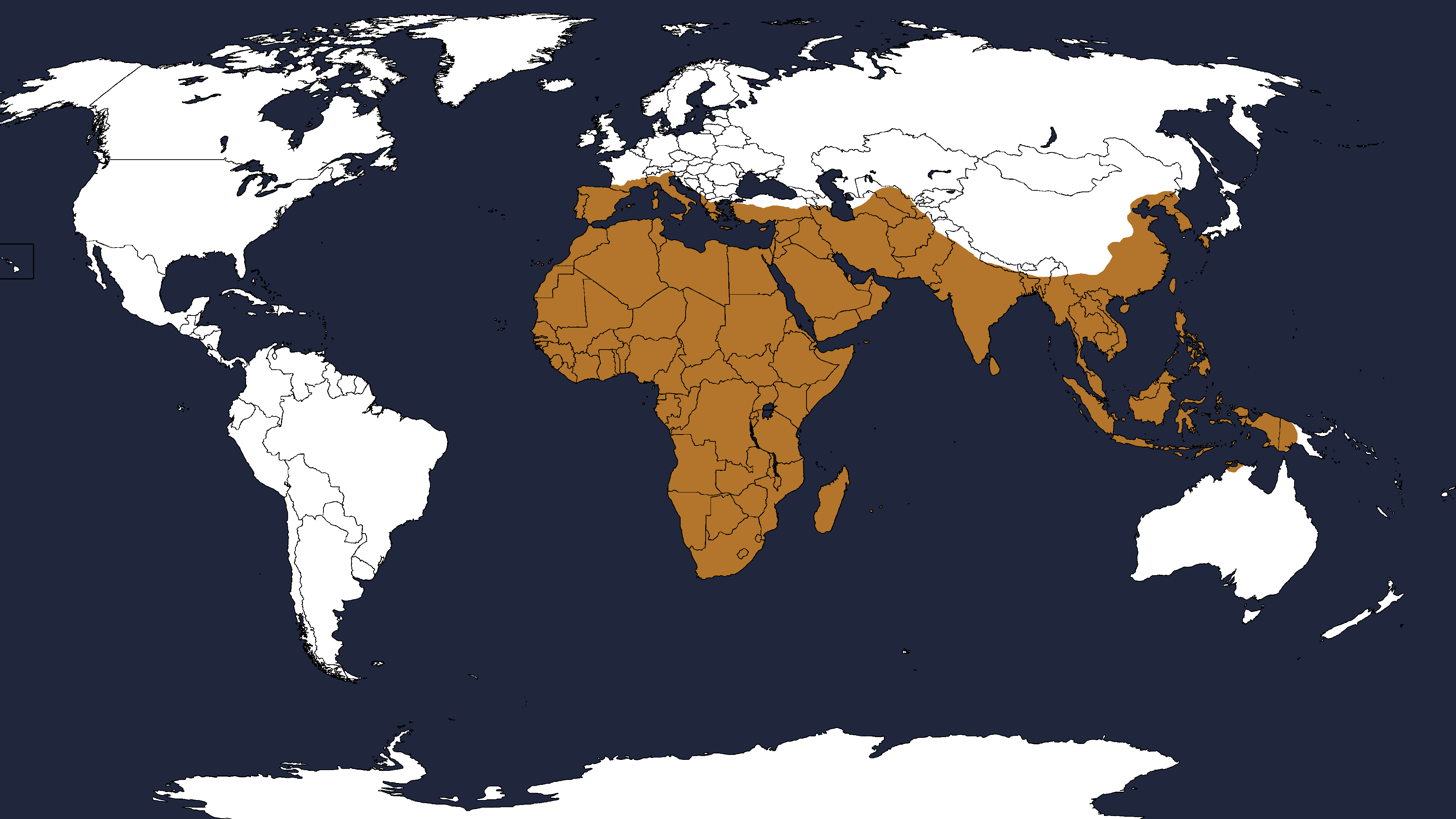

Synonyms
- Papilio chrysippus Linnaeus, 1758; Danais chrysippus (lapsus); Anosia chrysippus; Papilio aegyptius Von Schreber, 1759; Papilio asclepiadis Gagliardi, 1811; Limnas alcippoides Moore, 1883; Danais dorippus ab. albinus Lanz, 1896; Danaida dorippus ab. infumata Aurivillius, 1899; Danaus dorippus ab. transiens Suffert, 1900; Danaus dorippus ab. semialbinus Strand, 1910; Danaus chrysippus ab. praealbata Froreich, 1928; Danaus (Limnas) chrysippus ab. impunctata Dufrane, 1948; Danaus (Limnas) chrysippus ab. bipunctata Dufrane, 1948; Danaus (Limnas) chrysippus ab. duplicata Dufrane, 1948; Danaus (Limnas) chrysippus ab. anomala Dufrane, 1948; Danaus (Limnas) chrysippus ab. reducta Dufrane, 1948; Danaus (Limnas) chrysippus ab. subreducta Dufrane, 1948; Danaus (Limnas) chrysippus ab. completa Dufrane, 1948; Danaus (Limnas) chrysippus ab. duponti Dufrane, 1948; Danaus (Limnas) chrysippus ab. deficiens Dufrane, 1948; Danaus (Limnas) chrysippus ab. radiata Dufrane, 1948; Danaus (Panlymnas) chrysippus liboria f. witteellus Overlaet, 1955; Danaus chrysippus f. hypermnestra Stoneham, 1958; Papilio alcippus Cramer, 1777; Danaida chrysippus ab. chrysippellus Strand, 1909; Danaida chrysippus var. orientis Aurivillius, 1909; Danaus chrysippus liboria Hulstaert, 1931

= Danaus chrysippus =

Plain tiger African queen

Species of butterfly

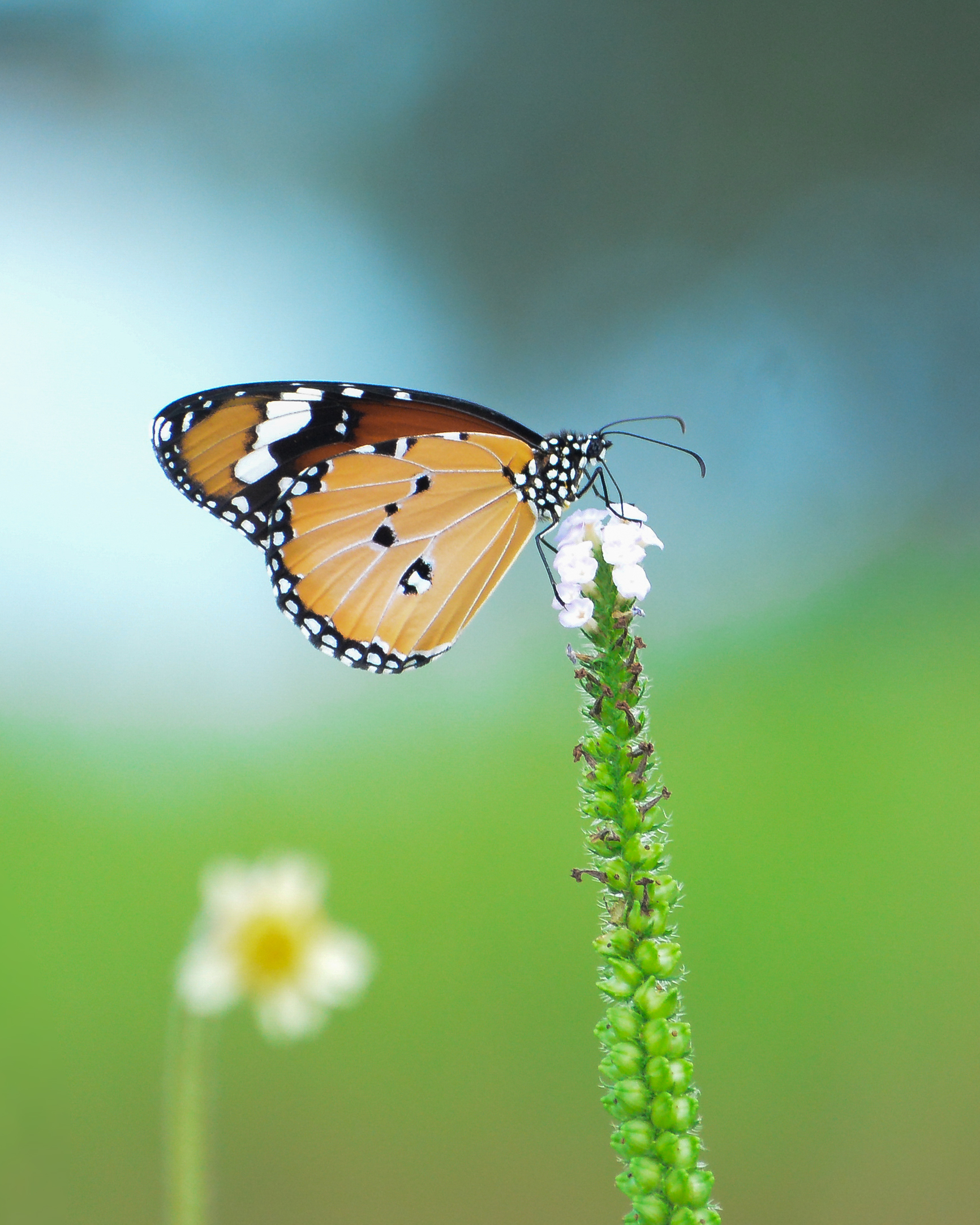
Plain Tiger

Danaus chrysippus, also known as the plain tiger, African queen, or African monarch, is a medium-sized butterfly widespread in Asia, Australia and Africa. It belongs to the Danainae subfamily of the brush-footed butterfly family Nymphalidae. Danainae primarily consume plants in the genus Asclepias, more commonly called milkweed. Milkweed contains toxic compounds, cardenolides, which are often consumed and stored by many butterflies. Because of their emetic properties, the plain tiger is unpalatable to most predators. As a result, its colouration is widely mimicked by other species of butterflies. The plain tiger inhabits a wide variety of habitats, although it is less likely to thrive in jungle-like conditions and is most often found in drier, wide-open areas.

D. chrysippus encompasses three main subspecies: D. c. alcippus, D. c. chrysippus, and D. c. orientis. These subspecies are found concentrated in specific regions within the larger range of the entire species.

The plain tiger is believed to be one of the first butterflies depicted in art. A 3,500-year-old ancient Egyptian fresco in Luxor features the oldest known illustration of this species.

== Description ==
D. chrysippus is a medium-sized butterfly with a wingspan of about 7–8 cm (2.8–3.1 in). The body is black with white spots. The wings are a brownish orange, the upper side brighter and richer than the underside. The apical half of the forewing is black with a white band. The hindwing has three black spots in the centre. The wings are bordered in black and outlined with semicircular white spots. This species exhibits slight sexual dimorphism, as the male has large scent glands on his hindwings, which the female lacks. They appear as a large black spot with a white centre if viewed from the underside

D. chrysippus is a polymorphic species, so the exact colouring and patterning vary within and between populations.

It is similar in appearance to the Indian fritillary (Argynnis hyperbius), which may coexist with it.

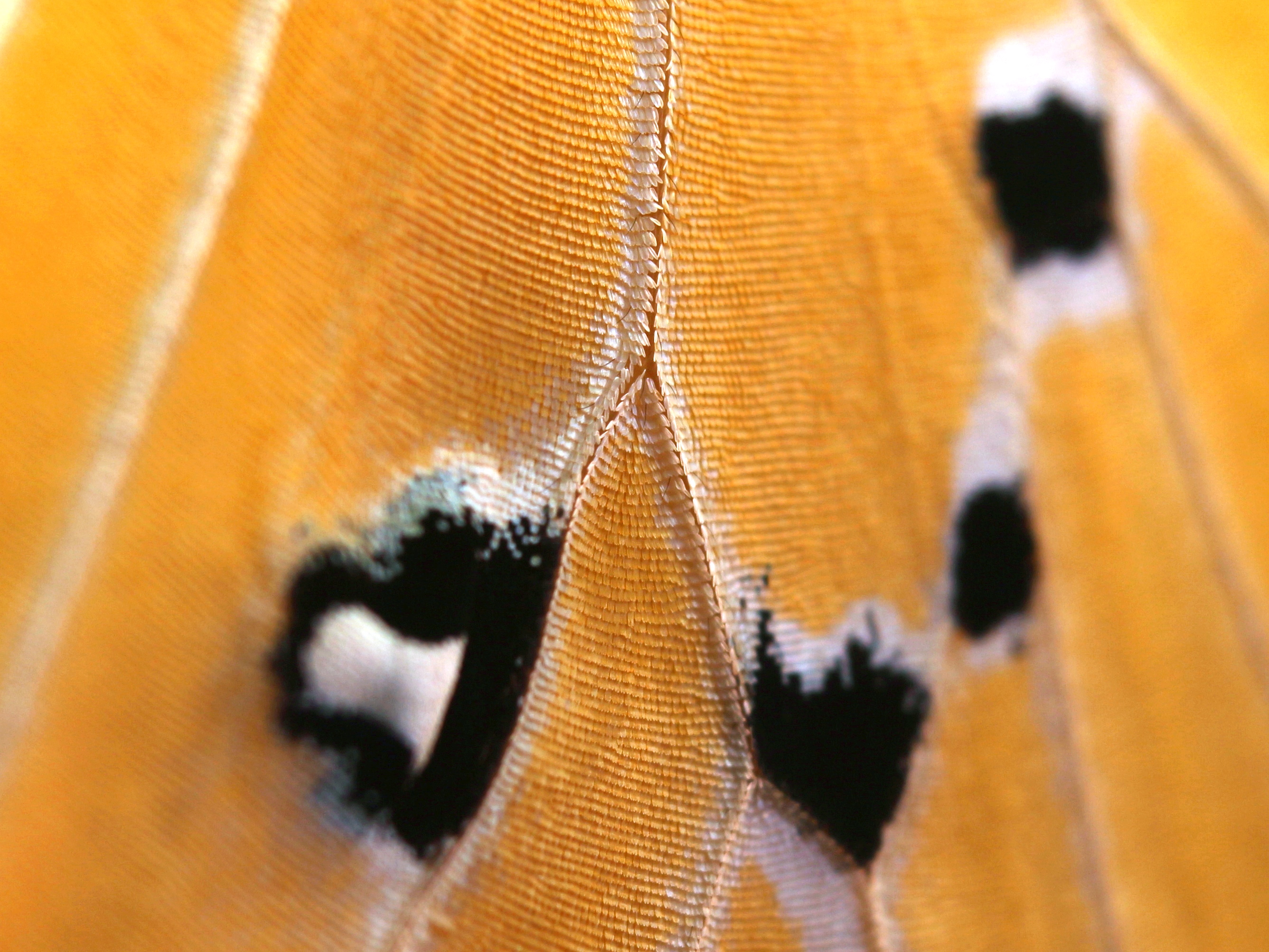
Close-up of the wing scales of a male Danaus chrysippus

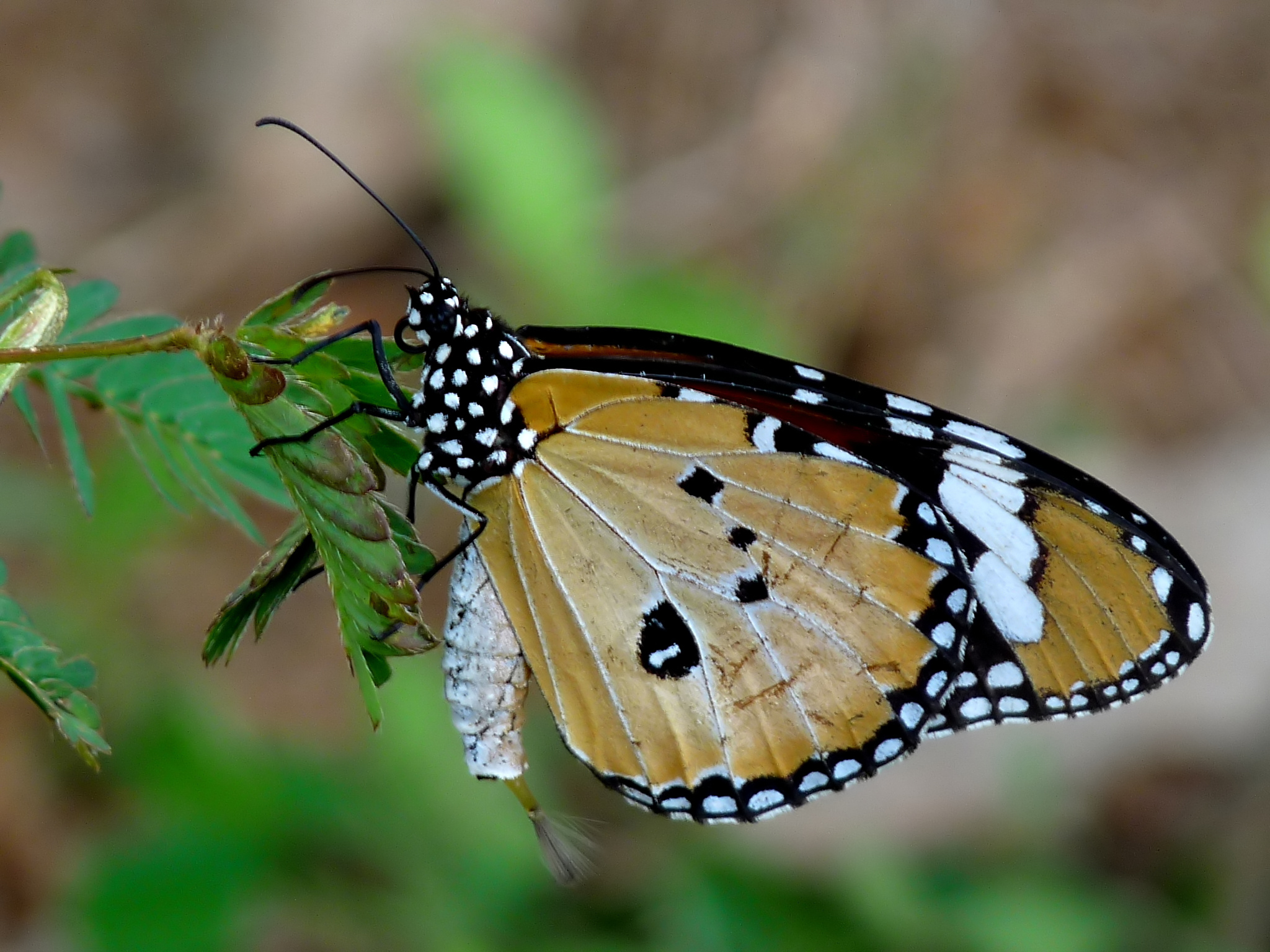
Male showing the pheromone pouch and brush-like organ in Kerala

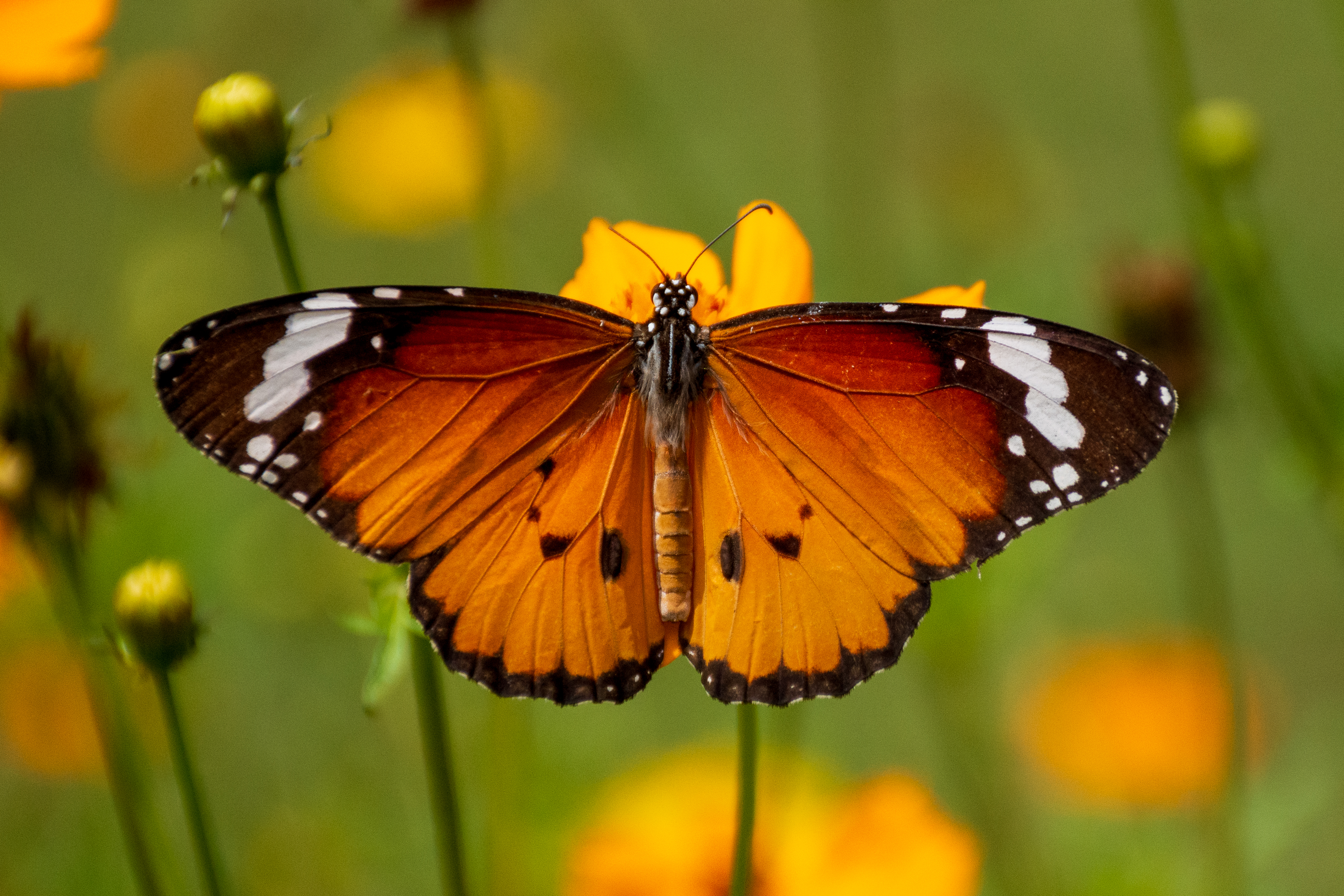
Dorsal view, wings fully open

== Geographic range ==
The plain tiger is found across the entirety of Africa, where the predominant subspecies is D. c. alcippus. Its range extends across the majority of Asia throughout Indian subcontinent, as well as many south Pacific islands. The plain tiger is even present in parts of Australia. D. c. chrysippus is most common throughout Asia and in some select regions in Africa, while D. c. orientis is present in more tropical African regions as well as some African islands, including Madagascar and the Seychelles. It is also found in Southern Europe and Kuwait. These insects are considered bioinvaders in North America.

== Habitat ==
The plain tiger prefers arid, open areas, and is found in a variety of habitats, including deserts, mountains, deciduous forests, and human-tended gardens in cities and parks. It is comfortable at altitudes ranging from sea level to around 1,500 m (4,900 ft).

== Food resources ==
=== Larval food plants ===
The plain tiger's larval host plants are from several families, most importantly Asclepiadoideae (Apocynaceae):

- Apteranthes burchardii (recorded from Canary Islands/Spain)
- Asclepias – milkweeds (recorded on A. cancellata, A. coarctata, A. curassavica, A. fulva, A. kaessneri, A. lineolata, A. reflexa, A. scabrifolia, A. semilunata, A. stenophylla, A. swynnertonii, A. syriaca)
- Aspidoglossum interruptum
- Calotropis – mudar (recorded on C. gigantea, C. procera)
- Ceropegia dichotoma (recorded from Canary Islands/Spain)
- Cryptolepis dubia
- Cynanchum (recorded on C. abyssinicum, C. acutum, C. altiscandens, C. amplexicaule, C. carnosum, C. floribundum, C. pulchellum, C. rostellatum, C. sublanceolatum)
- Gomphocarpus (recorded on G. fruticosus, G. physocarpus)
- Kanahia laniflora
- Leichhardtia australis
- Leptadenia lanceolata
- Orbea variegata (recorded from Canary Islands/Spain)
- Pentatropis (recorded on P. atropurpurea, P. quinquepartita)
- Pergularia daemia
- Periploca linearifolia
- Secamone (recorded on S. afzelii, S. parvifolia, S. platystigma)
- Stapelia gigantea
- Stathmostelma (recorded on S. gigantiflorum, S. pedunculatum)
- Vincetoxicum (recorded on V. cernuum, V. sylvaticum, V. tanakae,)

Host plants from other families include Dyerophytum indicum (Plumbaginaceae), Ficus (Moraceae; recorded on F. laevis, F. racemosa), Ipomoea (Convolvulaceae; recorded on I. alba, I. bona-nox), Lepisanthes rubiginosa (Sapindaceae) as well as some Euphorbiaceae, Malvaceae, Poaceae, Rosaceae and Scrophulariaceae.

=== Adult food plants ===
Adult plain tiger butterflies obtain nectar from various flowering plants. The particular plants available vary depending on the geographic range of the butterfly population and the season, as certain plants do not flower throughout the entire year.

==== India ====
- Antigonon leptopus, January through April and August through December
- Asystasia gangetica
- Catharanthus roseus
- Cyanthillium cinereum
- Heliotropium indicum
- Lantana camara
- Tecoma stans, May through December
- Tridax procumbens

==== Australia ====
- Asclepias
- Daviesia
- Eucalyptus conglobata
- E. oleosa
- Goodenia maideniana
- Lantana
- Leucopogon
- Ptilotis obovatus

In addition to nectar, adult plain tigers obtain pyrrolizidine alkaloids from the dead stems of different plant types. In Australia, the following plants have been identified as sources of pyrrolizidine alkaloids for D. chrysippus:

- Echium plantogineum
- Heliotropium amplexicaule
- Parsonsia eucalyptophylla
- P. straminea
- Senecio pterophorus

== Reproduction ==
=== Oviposition ===
Females lay eggs singly on the underside of the leaves of a larval food plant. The eggs are most often laid close to the ground.

== Life history ==
=== Egg ===
The egg of the plain tiger is about 1.7 mm (0.067 in) long and 0.5 mm (0.020 in) across. When first laid it is white, but gradually turns brown over time. The egg is ridged and dome-shaped. Depending on temperature, the egg is typically hatched in 3–5 days.

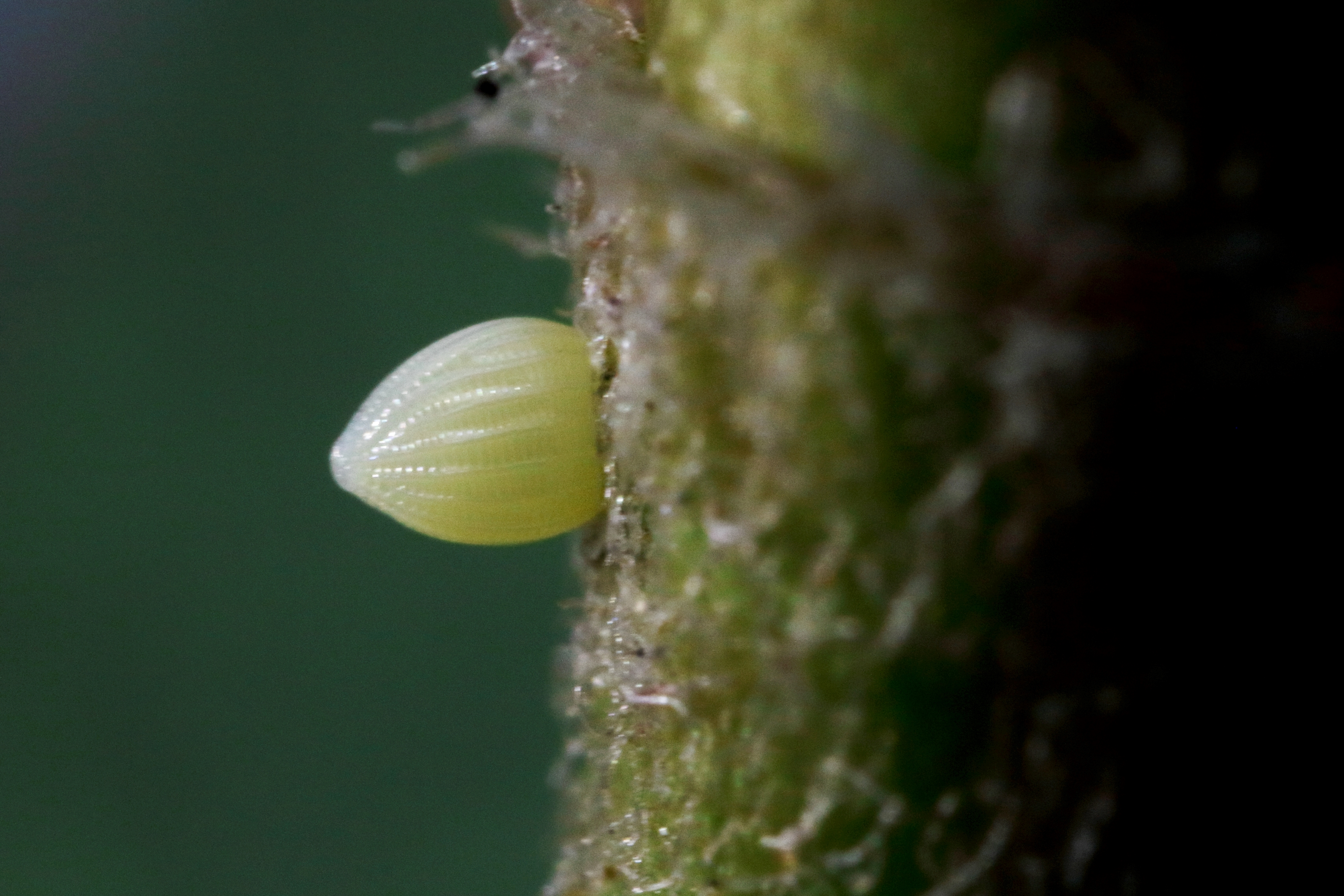
Egg at Tamil Nadu, India

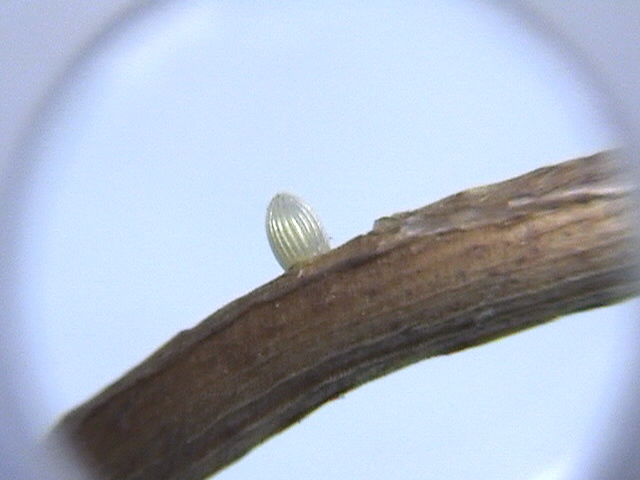
At Mananpur, Mumbai, Maharashtra

=== Caterpillar ===
The larvae of D. chrysippus proceeds through five instar stages. The first instar is about 4 mm (0.16 in) long, and its body is white while the head is black. The second instar is about 8 mm (0.31 in) long, and its body is primarily gray with yellow and black horizontal stripes. This colouration remains for the final three instar stages. The third instar is about 14 mm (0.55 in) long, the fourth about 25 mm (0.98 in) long, and the fifth about 36 mm (1.4 in) long. Depending on temperature, the larval stage can last from 12 to 20 days.

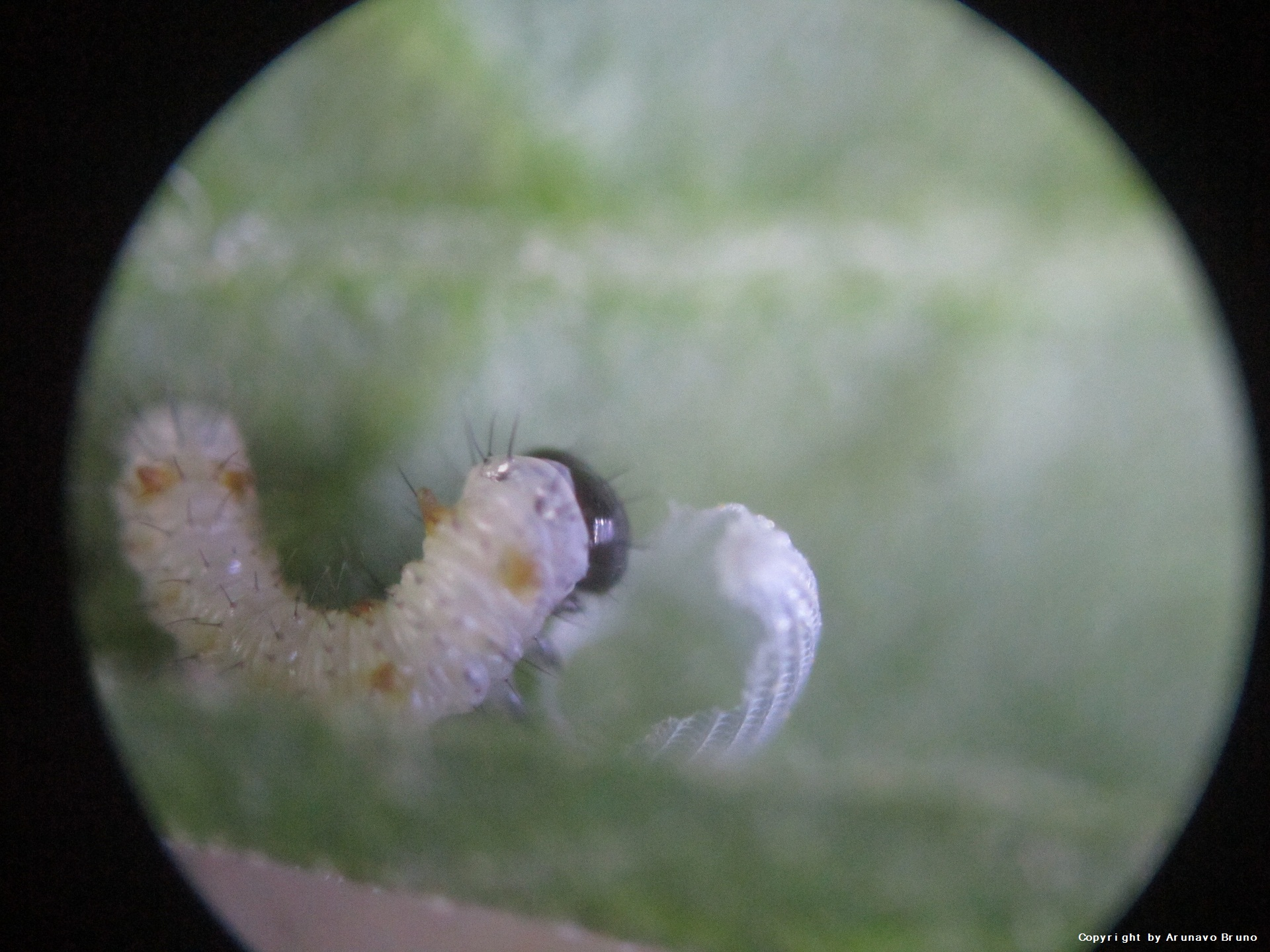
Larva eating its own eggshell

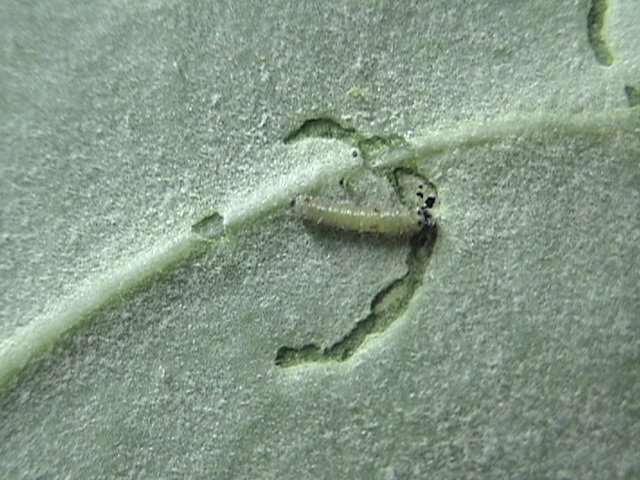
Caterpillar making "moat" to feed during the first instar

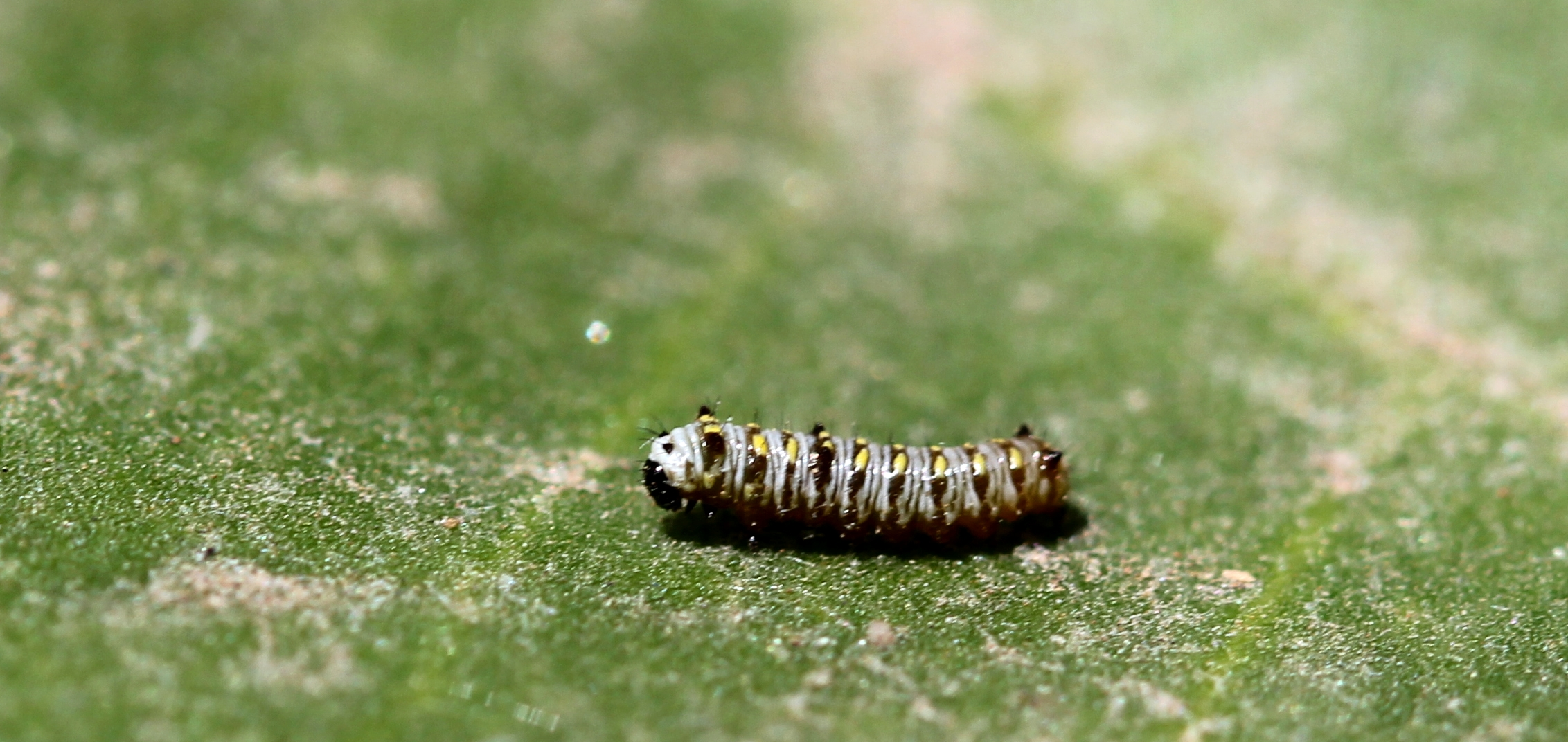
Second instar

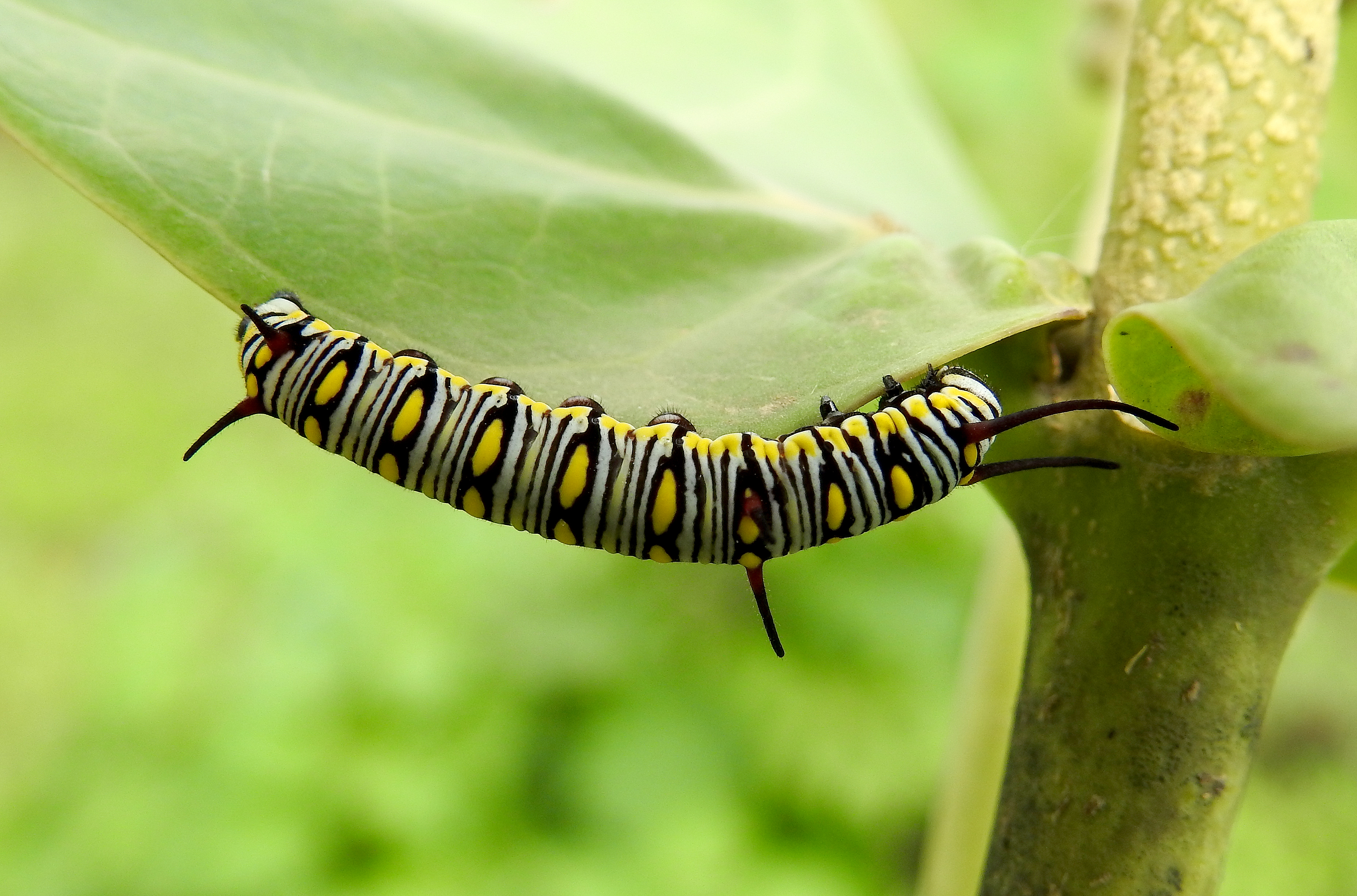
Mature caterpillar

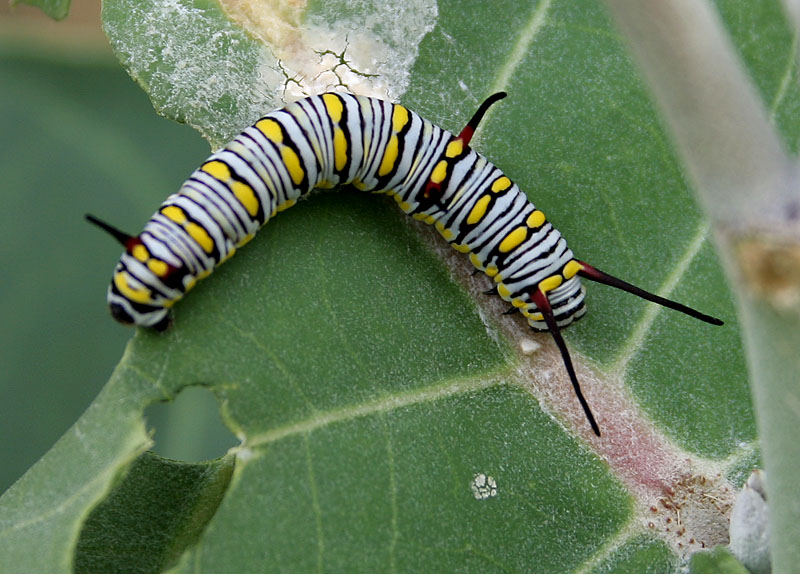
Older caterpillar

=== Prepupal and pupal stages ===
Before pupation, the caterpillar will become motionless and cease feeding. Its colour shifts slightly from gray to brown, and it may lose a small amount of body mass. The prepupal stage lasts 1–3 days depending on temperature. The pupal stage lasts 9–15 days depending on temperature, and the pupa changes colour over this period from a pale green to dark brown. Pupae are about 17 mm (0.67 in) tall and 8 mm (0.31 in) wide.

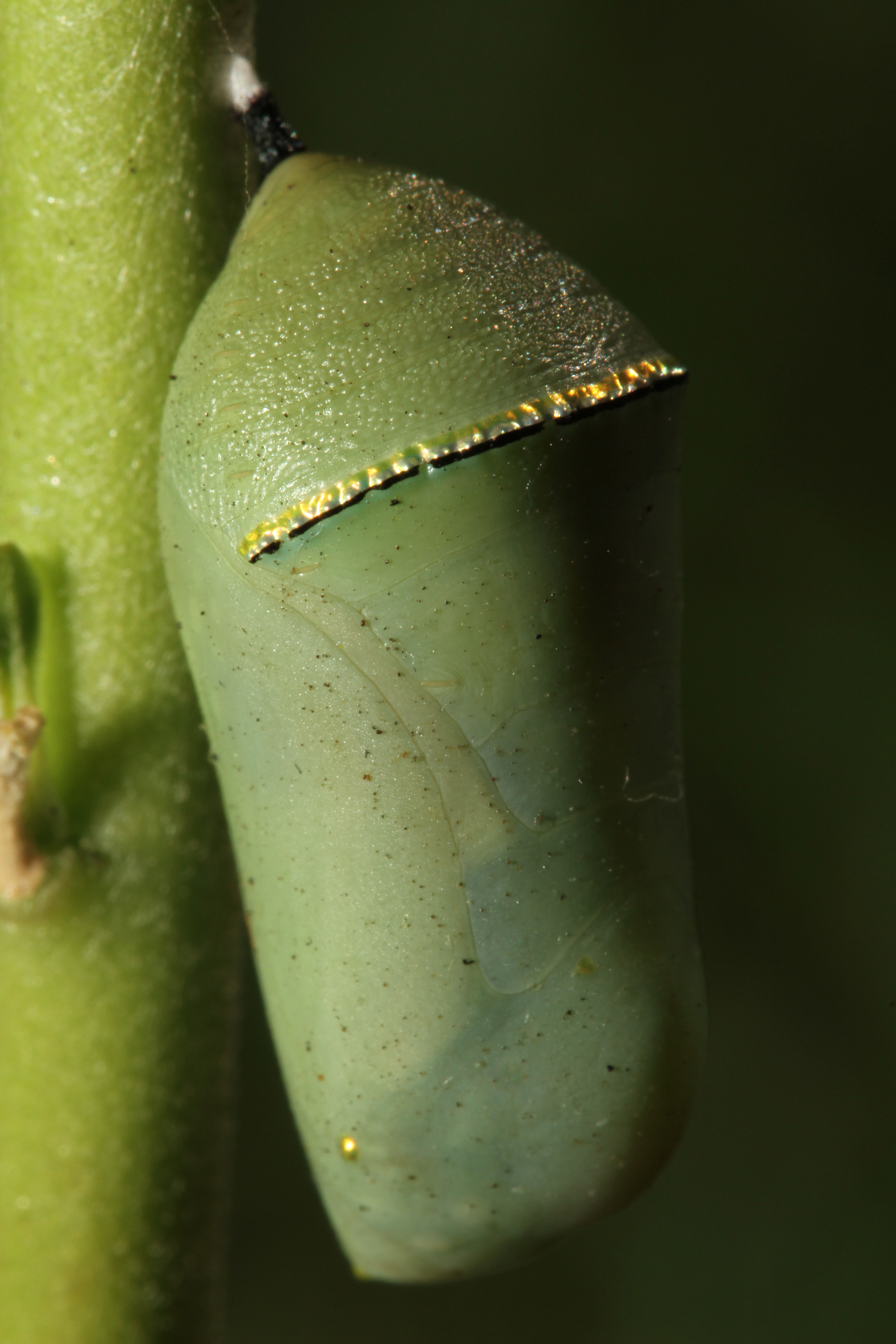
Pupa

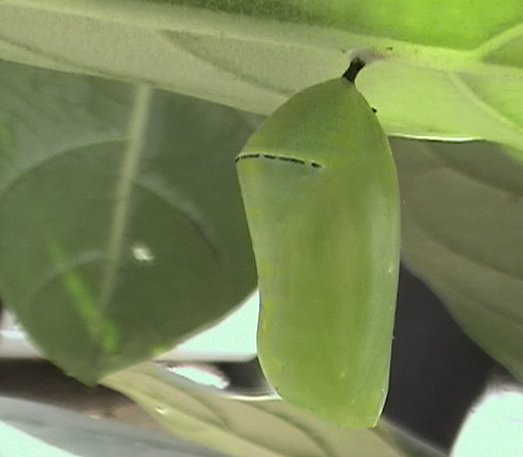
Fresh pupa at Bandra Kurla Complex, Mumbai

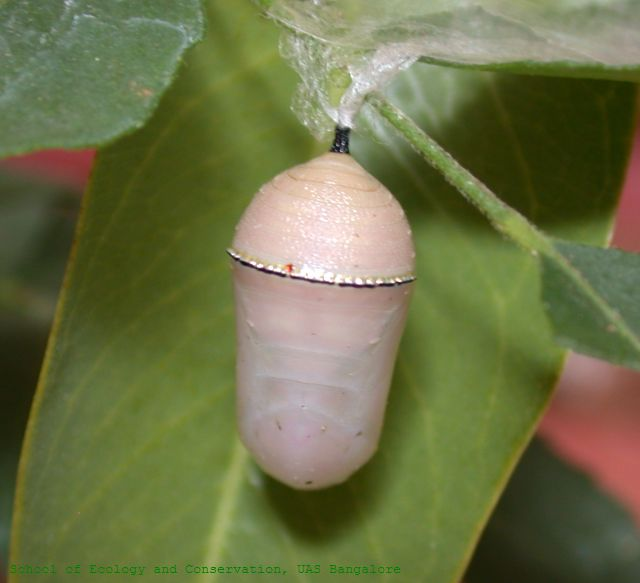
Pink pupa due to pupation among inanimate objects

=== Adult ===
Male and female D. chrysippus butterflies look very similar and are also similar in size. Adult butterflies typically have a wingspan of 75 mm (3.0 in). The bodies of adult plain tigers are about 23 mm (0.91 in) long, and their antennae are about 12 mm (0.47 in) long. Depending on temperature, males live about 10–15 days and females live about 7–12 days.

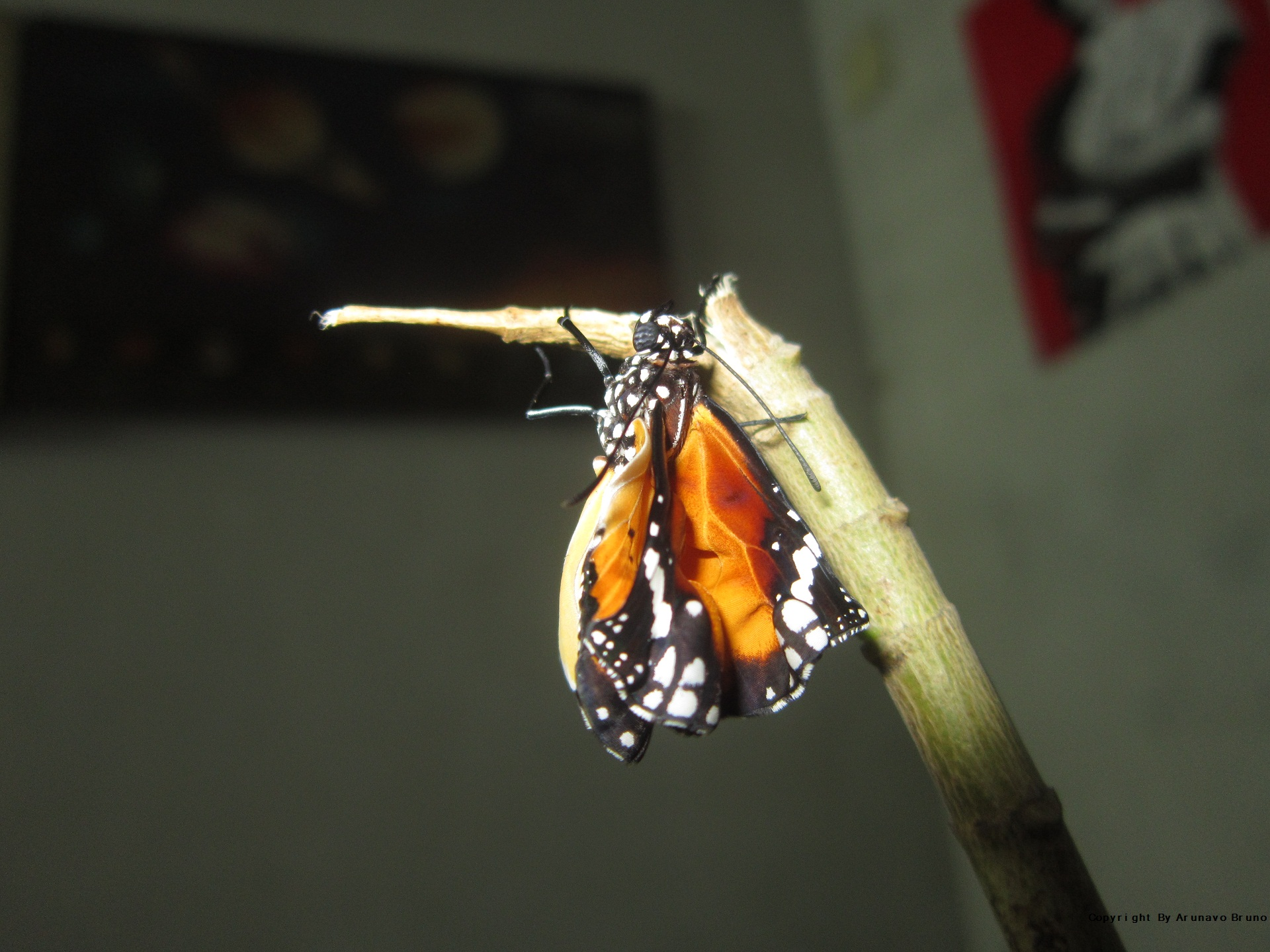
A newly emerged plain tiger female in captivity

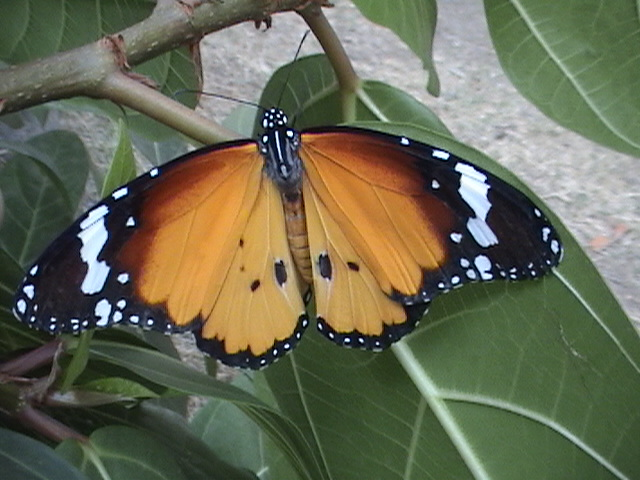
Male D. c. chrysippus, recently emerged from chrysalis

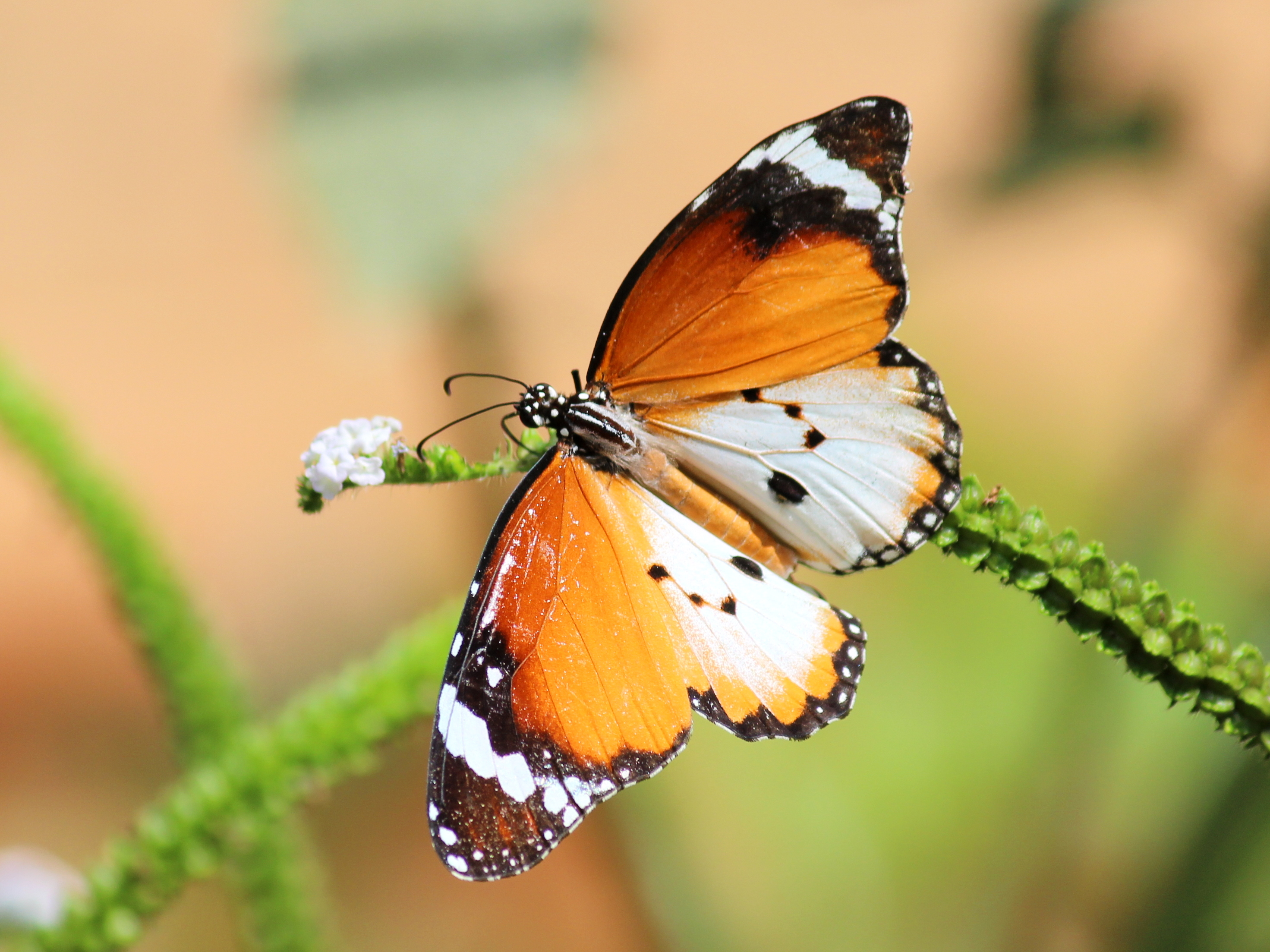
Form alcippoides in Mysore, Karnataka, India

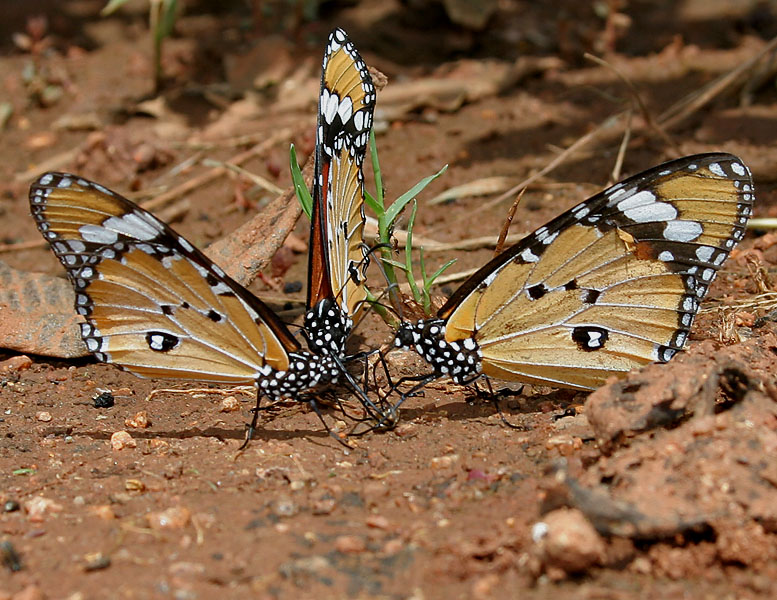
Mud-puddling

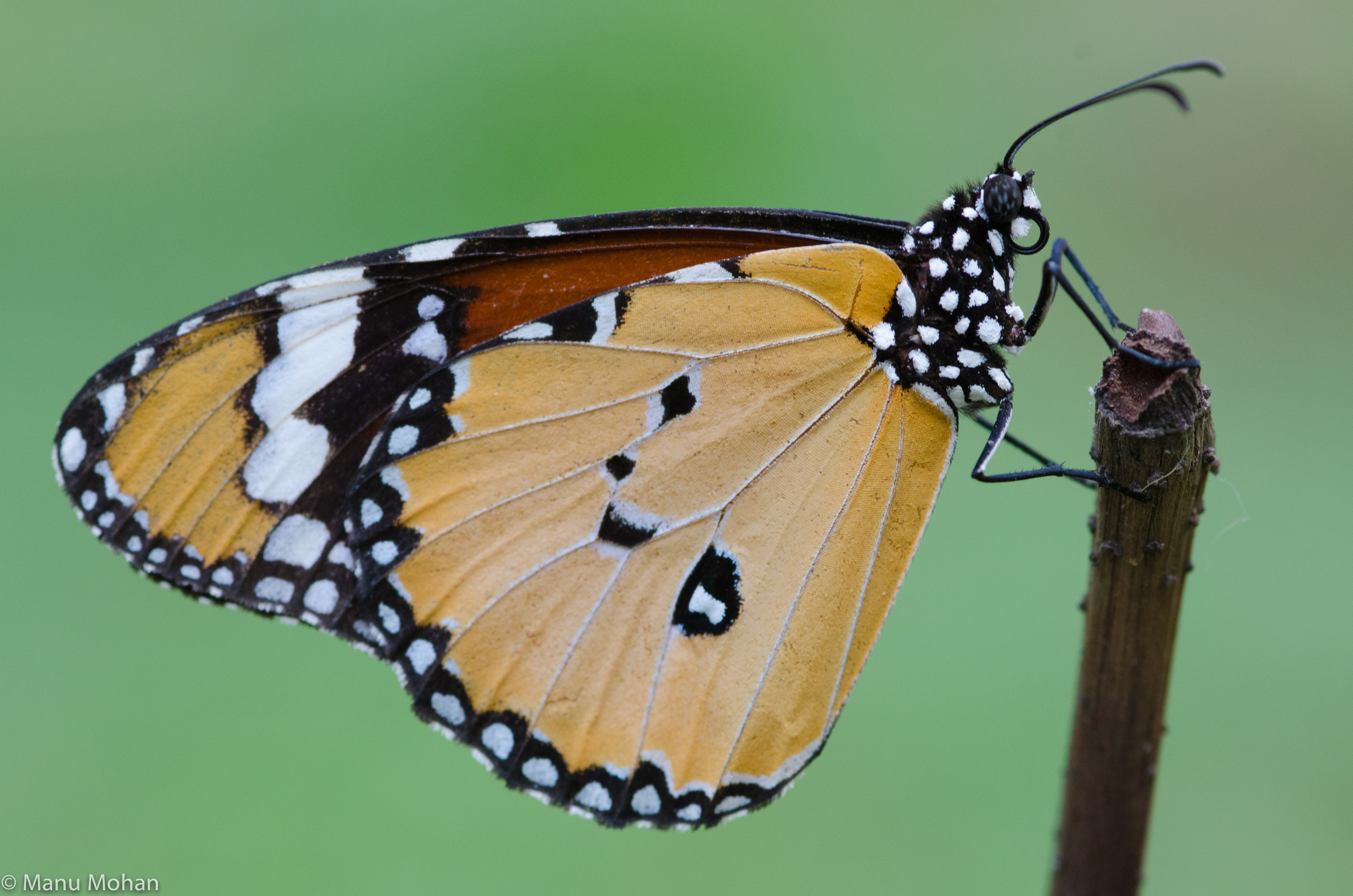
Resting with its wings closed

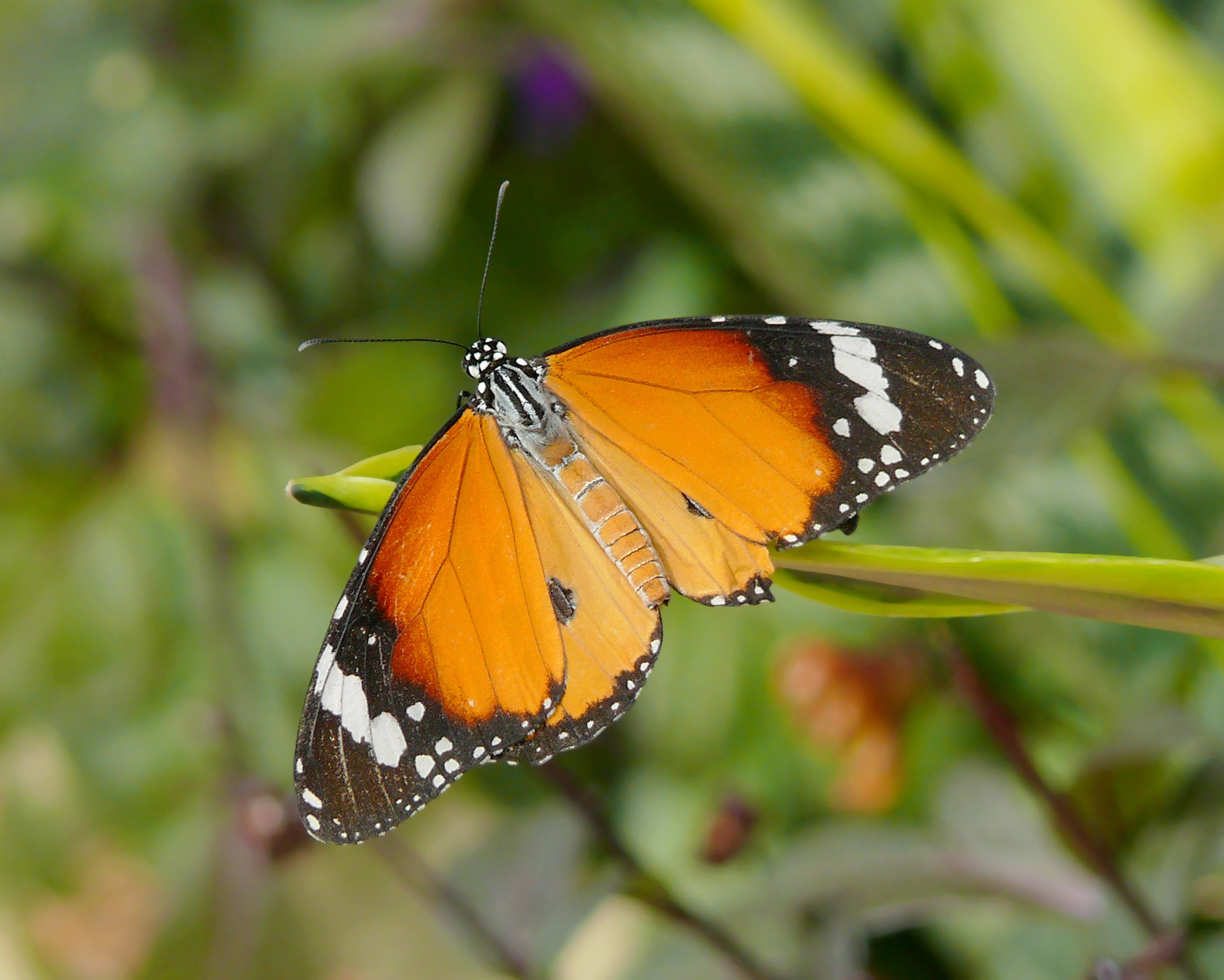
Basking

== Enemies ==
=== Predators ===
==== Egg and larval predators ====
Most predators of the early developmental stages of D. chrysippus are arthropods. Such potential predators include various kinds of spiders, assassin bugs, cockroaches, ladybugs, ants, and mantises. The caterpillars will even cannibalise each other. Egg and larval mortality is often high; as many as 84% of eggs may be lost to predation and up to 97% of larvae can be lost by the fifth instar, although most larval deaths occur during the third instar.

==== Adult predators ====
The most common predators of adult plain tigers are birds. In eastern Africa, the most common predator is the fiscal shrike L. c. humeralis.

=== Parasites ===
There are several organisms which parasitise the larvae of D. chrysippus. The fly S. flavohalterata of the Family Tachinidae is responsible for small amounts of parasitisation in D. chrysippus populations. It is unclear whether the fly oviposits on the eggs of D. chrysippus or whether the fly oviposits on leaves which are then consumed by D. chrysippus larvae. S. flavohalterata does not kill the larvae, and development is normal until the pupal stage, when larvae dies and the parasite emerges from the pupa instead. A. chrysippi, a parasitic wasp of the family Braconidae, oviposits on larvae early in their development and then kills them in the later stages. As many as fifty wasps may emerge from one large caterpillar, and they then pupate on the deceased host. Parasitic wasps of the genus Charops also infest plain tiger populations, likely during the egg or first instar stage, and then kill the larvae in a later instar stage.

Sturmia convergens is also a parasitoid of D. chrysippus.

=== Diseases ===
The plain tiger is infected by a male-killing bacterium called Spiroplasma. Male-killing bacteria are transmitted vertically, from mother to offspring. Female plain tigers infected with Spiroplasma will produce all-female broods, because the bacteria kills infected male offspring during either their embryonic or first larval instar stage. Although male-killing bacteria are uncommon in species which lay eggs singly. Experimentally treating infected females with antibiotics restored an even sex ratio to their subsequent broods, thus indicating that it is indeed Spiroplasma which is responsible for all-female broods in D. chrysippus. However, the prevalence of this bacteria in the plain tiger seems to be restricted to east African populations.

== Protective coloration and behavior ==
The plain tiger is mimicked by several species due to its unpalatability to potential predators. Previously, it was thought that cardenolides obtained from food sources during the larval stage were responsible for the aversive nature of adult D. chrysippus, but many larval food sources lack cardenolides, and some adult West African populations of D. chrysippus do not store cardenolides well, yet still repel predators. More recently, pyrrolizidine alkaloids have been proposed to be responsible for the unpalatability of D. chrysippus. Adult male danaines often feed on plants containing pyrrolizidine alkaloids, and although females rarely do, they may be protected simply through their resemblance to males of the same species. The ability of D. chrysippus to store cardenolides varies across populations, so likely both cardenolides and pyrrolizidine alkaloids contribute to the unpalatability of D. chrysippus to different extents depending on the population.

Because the plain tiger is unpalatable (also called inedible), they are aposematic – their bright colouration serves as a warning to predators that they are either distasteful or toxic. Consequently, once a predator has made the mistake of attempting to eat a plain tiger, they will refrain in the future from attacking similarly coloured butterflies. This has led to the evolution of a number of other species which mimic the plain tiger in order to co-opt the protection conferred by such bright colouration.

=== Batesian mimicry ===
Batesian mimics are palatable species which mimic unpalatable species, and D. chrysippus is a model for several Batesian mimics, including H. misippus, P. poggei, M. marshalli, and P. dardanus in east Africa. Batesian mimicry is only effective so long as the mimic is less common than the model, or predators will learn that the mimics are in fact edible and then attempt to eat the similar-looking unpalatable butterflies.

=== Müllerian mimicry ===
Müllerian mimicry occurs when multiple species which are all unpalatable evolve to resemble one another. In this case, the relative abundance of each species does not have a deleterious effect on any others, because a predator which eats any one of them will be deterred from eating any similar-looking butterflies. In Uganda, D. chrysippus has several Müllerian mimics, including A. encedon and A. encedana.

== Systematics and evolution ==
=== Subspecies ===
Despite the external similarity, the common tiger (D. genutia) is not closely related to the plain tiger. Three subspecies were considered valid in a 2005 review:

- Danaus chrysippus chrysippus

Asia, Mediterranean region, northern tropical Africa

- Danaus chrysippus alcippus (Cramer, 1777) – formerly D. c. aegyptius

From the Cape Verde Islands through tropical Africa to Yemen and Oman. Browner with broader white forewing spots.

- Danaus chrysippus orientis (Aurivillius, 1909) – formerly D. c. liboria

Saint Helena, southern tropical Africa to South Africa, Madagascar, Comoros, Seychelles and Mascarenes. Small white forewing spots.

D. c. alcippus is well on the way of becoming a distinct species.

On the other hand, the former subspecies petilia, nowadays is recognised as a good species, the lesser wanderer (D. petilia). More enigmatic is the status of the former subspecies (or forms) dorippus and bataviana. These are tentatively also regarded as a distinct species, the dorippus tiger (D. dorippus).

However, it appears (from analysis of mtDNA sequences, which are only inherited from the mother) that the dorippus tiger is the product of an ancient lineage of Danaus hybridizing with plain tiger females As the plain tiger is known to be parasitised at least occasionally by Spiroplasma bacteria which selectively kill off male hosts, a subsequent scarcity of plain tiger males might have led to this hybridisation and the evolution of the dorippus tiger. From the colour pattern of this species, it can be assumed that the ancient lineage had no black apex on the forewings, as this characteristic is still absent in D. dorippus.

The presumed subspecies cratippus most likely belongs to either the lesser wanderer or the dorippus tiger, but confirmation of its taxonomic status requires more research. In any case, these three species are closely related; their closest relatives, in turn, might be the soldier (D. eresimus) and queen (D. gilippus) butterflies.

Several local forms have been described from Asia:

- Danaus chrysippus chrysippus f. alcippoides

The upper hindwing is more or less very white; about half of the individuals have a second submarginal spot in the forewing. Occasionally found in South-East Asia, very rarely in India.

- Danaus chrysippus chrysippus f. gelderi

The upper hindwing has white markings. Occasionally found on Sulawesi.

- Danaus chrysippus chrysippus f. bowringi

The upper hindwing has a subapical band composed of somewhat larger spots, and an additional forewing spot as in f. alcippoides is always present. Found throughout the eastern parts of this subspecies' range.

On the other hand, the plethora of named taxa from Africa are apparently F_{1} or F_{2} hybrids between the plain tiger subspecies (the contact zone of which is in the general area of Uganda) and/or D. dorippus:

- Danaus chrysippus × alcippoides

is D. c. chrysippus × D. c. alcippus

- Danaus × transiens, Danaus × klugii, Danaus × albinus and Danaus × semialbinus

are D. c. alcippus × D. dorippus

=== Genomes ===
When D. chrysippus was analysed via a sample from Kampala, Uganda, it was found that the population was undergoing a significant level of evolutionary change. Three loci were examined, and genotypic frequency differences found at two of the three suggested that opposing selective forces, likely pertaining to Mullerian and Batesian mimicry, acting on males and females is contributing to a balanced polymorphism.

== Courtship and mating ==
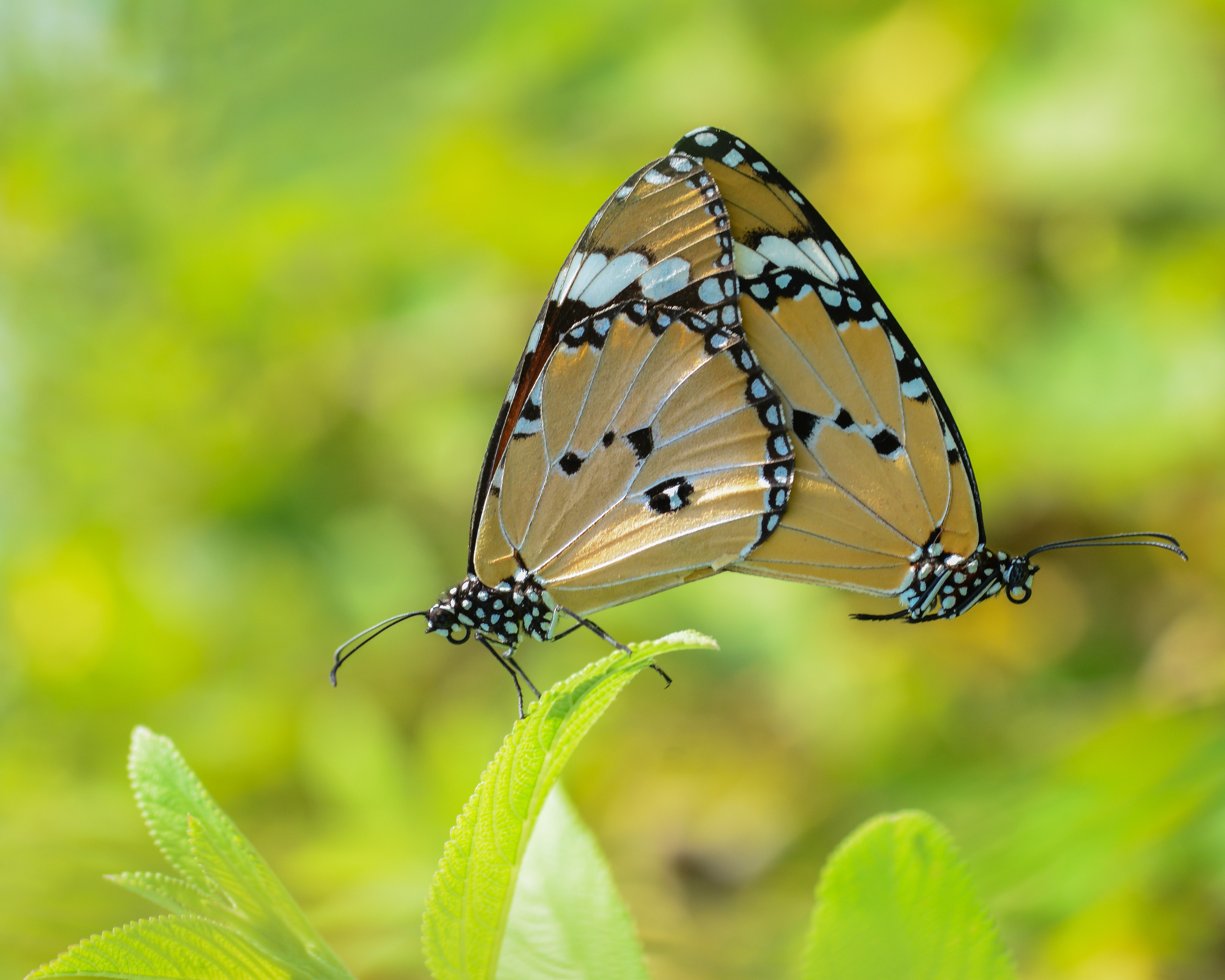
Mating of Plain Tiger

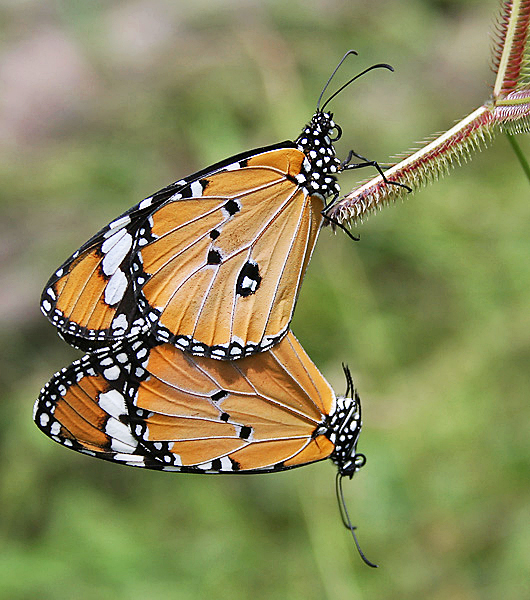
D. c. chrysippus mating in Hyderabad, India

In addition to conferring protection from predators, pyrrolizidine alkaloids are necessary in the mating ritual of D. chrysippus. Male plain tigers use the alkaloids to synthesize pheromones which are stored in hair-pencils sheathed in alar organs, which are specialised scales on top of the hindwing. The hair-pencils are fanned out during courtship to release these pheromones, and this appears to be necessary for attracting females. Males deprived of pyrrolizidine alkaloids in their diet are considerably less successful in mating; mating appears to occur preferentially between butterflies of the same subspecies, so colouration is likely also an important signal in the mating process. Female plain tigers have been recorded as mating up to four times.

== See also ==
- List of butterflies of India
- List of butterflies of India (Nymphalidae)
- List of butterflies of India (Danainae)
