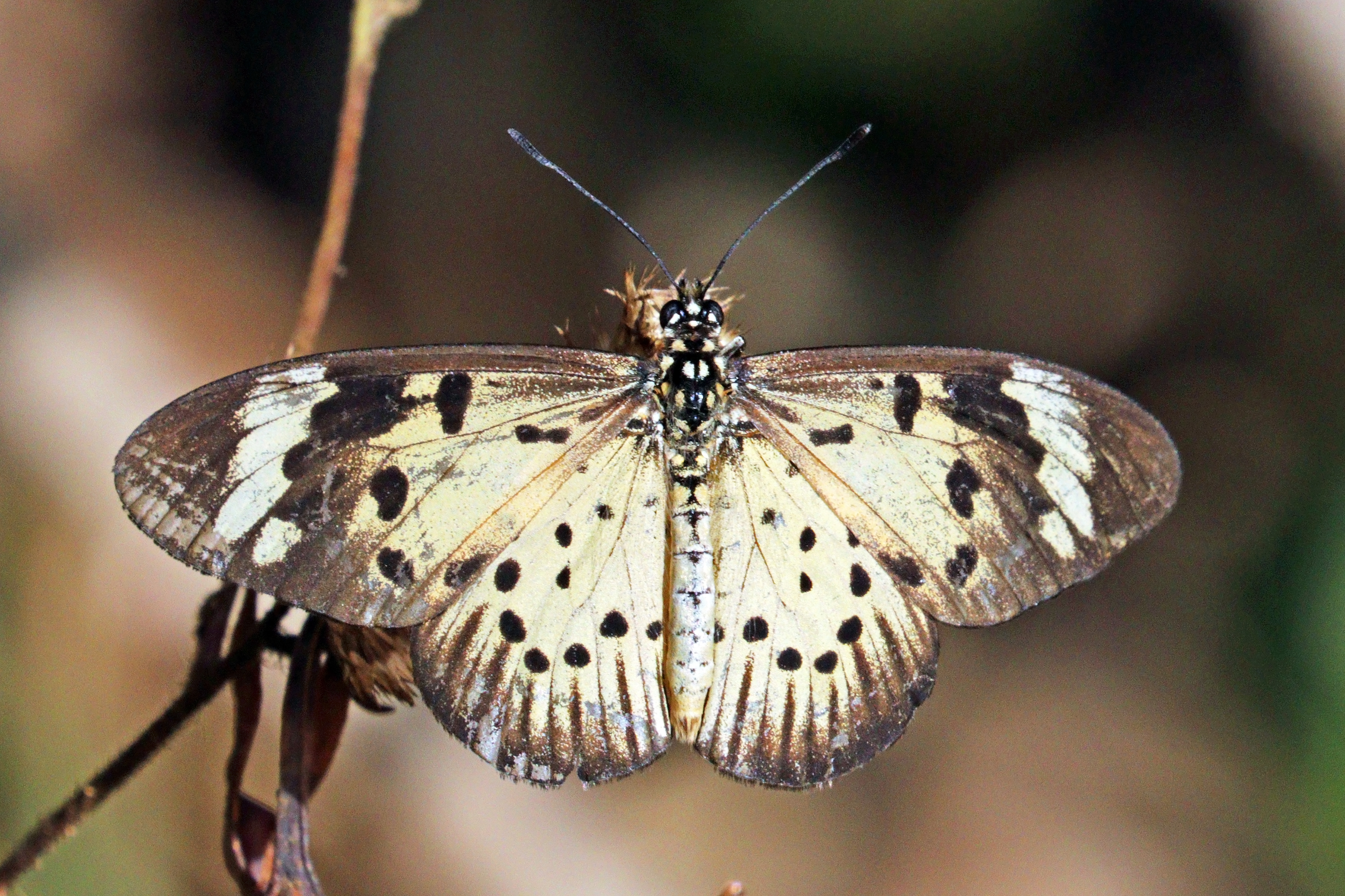

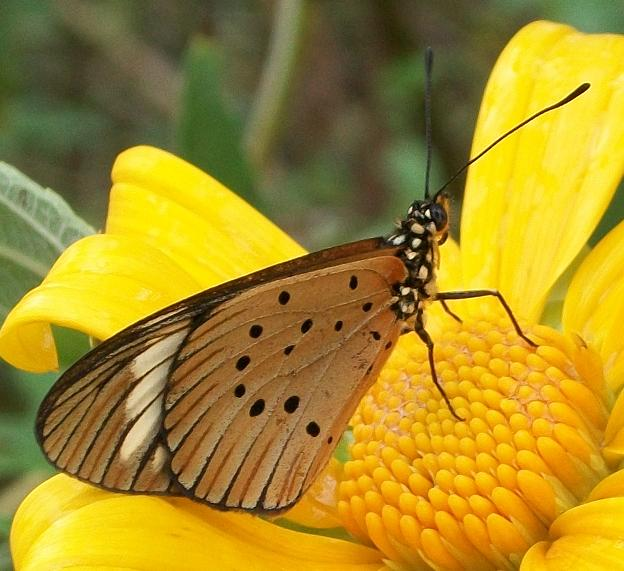
- Nominate subspecies in Madagascar and South Africa respectively

Scientific classification
- Kingdom: Animalia
- Phylum: Arthropoda
- Clade: Pancrustacea
- Class: Insecta
- Order: Lepidoptera
- Family: Nymphalidae
- Genus: Acraea
- Species: A. encedon

Binomial name
- Acraea encedon (Linnaeus, 1758)

Synonyms
- Papilio encedon Linnaeus, 1758; Hyalites encedon (Linnaeus, 1758); Telchinia encedon (Linnaeus, 1758); Papilio encedonia Linnaeus, 1767; Papilio lycia Fabricius, 1775; Acraea sganzini Boisduval, 1833; Acraea lycia var. fulva Doubleday, 1848; Acraea daira Godman and Salvin, 1884; Acraea braunei Staudinger, 1885; Acraea lycia ab. infuscata Staudinger, 1885; Acraea usagarae Vuillot, 1891; Acraea encedon lycia ab. ascrepticia Strand, 1912; Acraea encedon ab. fumosa Aurivillius, 1913; Acraea encedon f. commixta Poulton, 1913; Acraea encedon f. alcippoides Le Doux, 1923; Acraea encedon var. nigeriae Schultze, 1923; Acraea encedon f. perradiata Le Cerf, 1927; Acraea encedon lycia f. carbonaria Le Cerf, 1927; Acraea encedon f. poultoni Le Doux, 1931; Acraea encedon f. infuscatoides Le Doux, 1931; Acraea encedon f. umbratalcippina Le Doux, 1931; Acraea encedon f. lycoides Le Doux, 1931; Acraea lycia f. fulvoides Le Doux, 1931; Acraea lycia encedonoides Le Doux, 1931; Acraea lycia f. aurantiaca Le Doux, 1931

= Acraea encedon =

White-barred acraea

Species of butterfly

Acraea encedon, the common acraea, white-barred acraea or encedon acraea, is a butterfly of the family Nymphalidae. It is found in sub-Saharan Africa and south-western Arabia. It is one of the species of Acraea sometimes separated in Telchinia.

== Description ==
The wingspan is 40–50 mm (1.6–2.0 in), with the female being slightly larger than the male, but otherwise similar in pattern and colour. The apex of the forewing is blackish and divided by a white bar. The rest of the surface of the wings are usually orange with black spots, however paler varieties with a greyish or yellowish base colour are also found.

The butterfly is a polymorphic Müllerian mimic of Danaus chrysippus, which is a highly unusual phenomenon as Müllerian mimicry is almost always monomorphic.

Hilltopping studies show differences in behavior, as the ones doing so engage in more interactive behaviors such as perching and investigating conspecifics. In contrast, the non-hilltopping individuals are observed to give more time patrolling. Factors including age influence this behavior.

== Description in Seitz ==
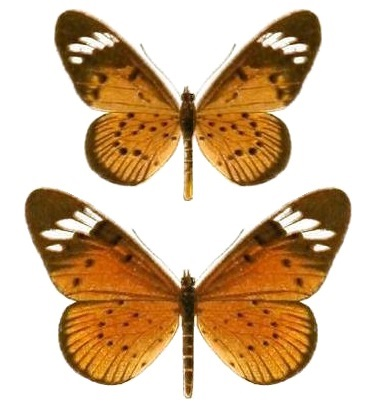
Male and female imagos in Adalbert Seitz (1925)

A. encedon is a very variable and widely distributed species and appears in many forms but with no definite local races. The black dots are the same in all the forms and are arranged as follows. Fore wing: 1 or 2 basal dots in 1b; a transverse spot in the cell; discal dots in 1b to 6, of which that in 1b is often double and always placed much nearer to the distal margin than the one in 2; in the forms with black apex discal dots 3 to 6 on the upper surface are indistinct against the dark ground-colour. Hindwing: basal dots in (1a), 1b, 1c and 7; 1 or 2 dots in the cell; one dot each in the basal angle of cellules 4 and 5 and discal dots in 1b to 7, of which the one in 3 or 4 is placed nearer to the distal margin than the rest and the one in 2 nearer to the base than that in 1b. The hindwing above has a narrow black or blackish marginal band 1 to 2 mm. in breadth, beneath the streaks on the interneural folds are often red-yellow instead of black. Throughout Africa south of the Sahara and Madagascar.

- encedon L. (56 e). The apical half of the forewing above blackish with white subapical band composed of 5 or 6 spots in cellules 3-6 (9, 10); ground-colour otherwise red-brown to yellow-brown, beneath somewhat lighter. f. infuscata Stgr. only differs from encedon in the smoky brown ground-colour.
- f. alcippina Auriv. [A. encedana Pierre, 1976 morph] has the hindwing in the middle more or less extended white, but otherwise agrees with the type-form.
- f. sganzini Bdv. (56 e). Markings as in the type-form, but ground-colour straw-yellow to clay-yellow and marginal streaks on the underside of the hindwing usually black; marginal band on the upperside of the hind wing often widened and not sharply defined. Occurs especially on Madagascar.
- f. lycia F. (56 e) is very similar to f. sganzini, but has a white or whitish ground colour; occasionally the basal half of the fore wing is smoky black-grey on both surfaces and on the upperside only a little lighter than the apical half, ab. fumosa ab. nov. A specimen with 3 black dots in the cell of the hindwing was named ascrepticia (!) by Strand. [A. encedana Pierre, 1976 morph]

The following forms differ from the preceding in having the apical half of the forewing above not or scarcely darker than the basal half, with distinct black discal dots.

- f. necoda Hew. (56 e). [now species Acraea necoda] Ground-colour of both wings light grey; forewing with whitish subapical band.
- f. daira Godm. and Salv [A. encedana Pierre, 1976 morph]. Ground-colour of both wings light brown-yellow; the subapical band of the fore wing absent or only indicated by light yellowish spots.
- f. radiata Auriv. [A. encedana Pierre, 1976 morph] only differs from daira in having the extremities of the veins above broadly and triangularly edged with black and the posterior half of the hindwing whitish. Adamaua.

Larva slate-black with yellow lateral line, small white and yellow dorsal spots edged with black, and black spines; head black. Pupa white with the usual black markings. The larva lives on Commelina.

The agreement in colour and markings between the forms of Acraea encedon and those of the much larger Danaus chrysippus and D. dorippus is very remarkable. Compare A. encedon and D. chrysippus, A. alcippina and D. alcippus, A. daira and D. dorippus, A. radiata and D. dorippus ab. albinus.

== Distribution ==
There are two subspecies:

- Acraea encedon encedon is found in Africa south of the Sahara and in Madagascar. In South Africa this species is absent from the dry western parts of the country, but common in KwaZulu-Natal coastal areas on the eastern side of the country.
- Acraea encedon rathjensi Le Doux, 1933 is found in south-western Arabia.

Torben Larsen developed a species numbering system for his 2005 publication Butterflies of West Africa. The nominate subspecies is #1153. The 'Larsen' numbers have since been used with permission in A Sharp Eye on Butterflies of Ghana.

== Life cycle ==
The eggs are oval in shape. The larvae feed on Commelina species, such as C. diffusa. The flight period of the adults is all year, but they are most common from March to May. They are slow fliers, and perch on low-growing vegetation.

In some populations there are two kinds of females, one producing offspring in a normal 1:1 sex ratio, the other producing females only. In other populations the sex ratio is apparently normal. Scientists first believed the distorted sex-ratio was caused by a driving W chromosome. Later research suggests it is caused by cytoplasmic bacteria.

== Gallery ==
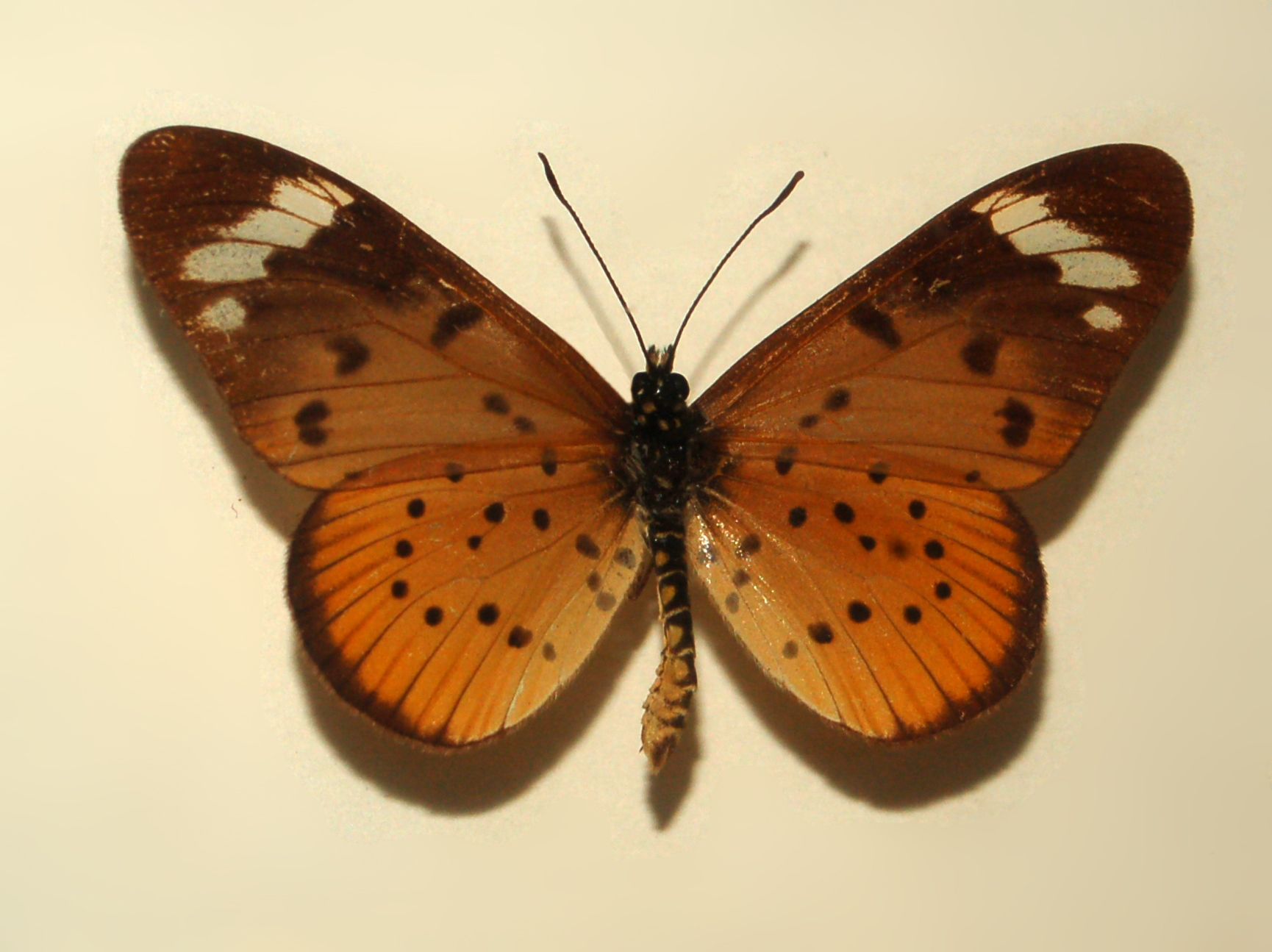
Mounted specimen from Eritrea

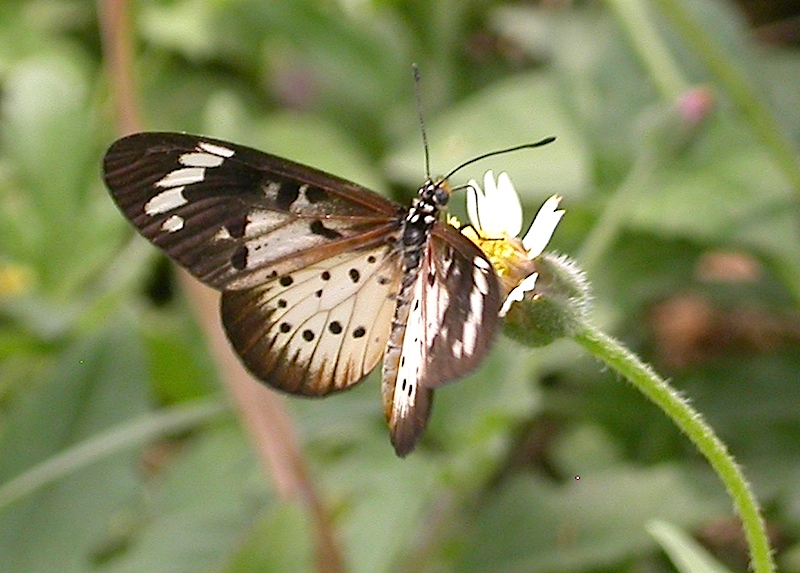
Imago in Benin

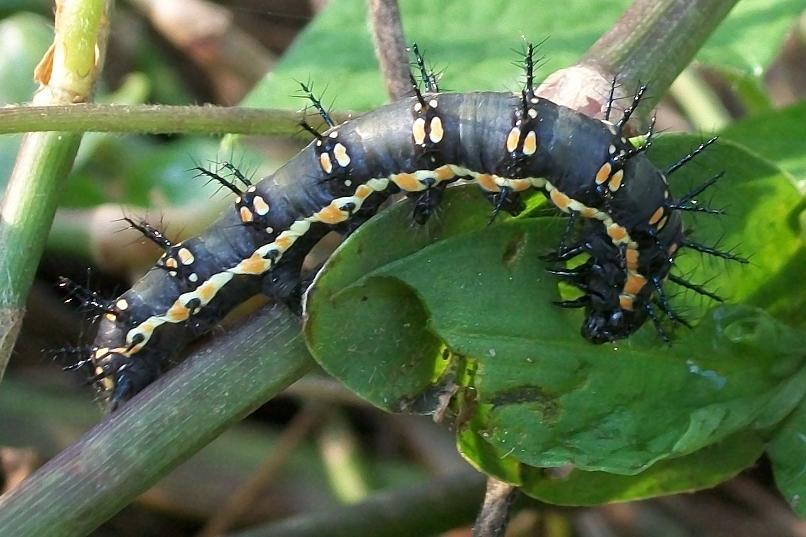
Larva of the nominate subspecies, KwaZulu-Natal

== Taxonomy ==
It is a member of the Acraea encedon species group, but see also Pierre & Bernaud, 2014

- Hyalites (group encedon) Henning, 1993, Metamorphosis 4 (2): 54
- Acraea (Actinote) (group encedon subgroup encedon) Pierre & Bernaud, 2009, Butterflies of the World 31: 2
- Telchinia (Telchinia) Henning & Williams, 2010, Metamorphosis 21 (1): 26
