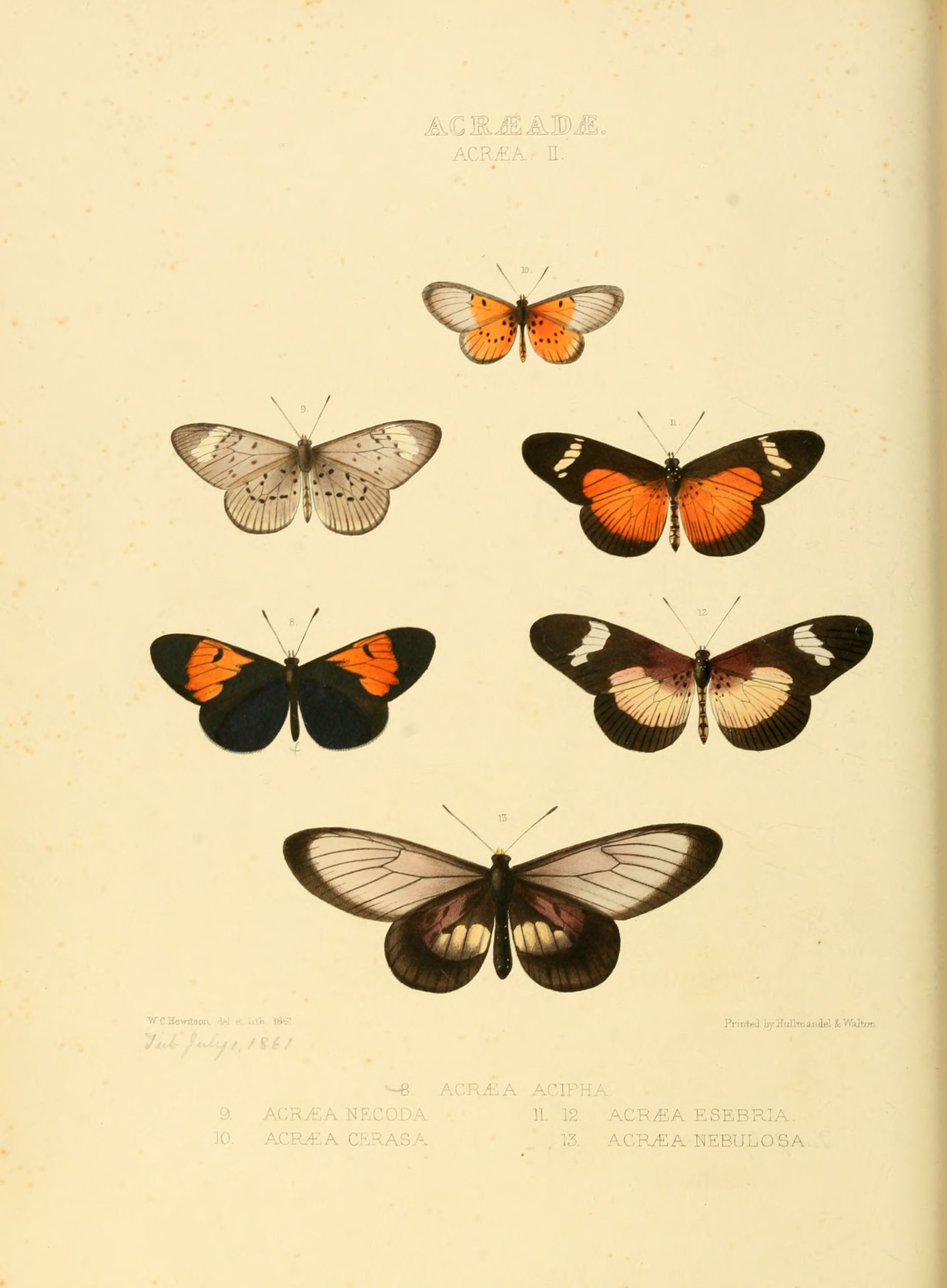
- Figure 9

Scientific classification
- Kingdom: Animalia
- Phylum: Arthropoda
- Class: Insecta
- Order: Lepidoptera
- Family: Nymphalidae
- Genus: Acraea
- Species: A. necoda

Binomial name
- Acraea necoda Hewitson, 1861

Synonyms
- Acraea (Actinote) necoda

= Acraea necoda =

Species of butterfly

Acraea necoda is a butterfly in the family Nymphalidae. It is found on the central and northern plateau in Ethiopia.

== Description ==
Very close to Acraea encedon q.v.

== Biology ==
The larvae feed on Urtica species.

== Taxonomy ==
- Hyalites (group encedon) Henning, 1993
- Telchinia (Telchinia) Henning & Williams, 2010
- Acraea (Actinote) (group encedon subgroup encedon) Pierre, J. & Bernaud, D., 2013

See also Pierre & Bernaud, 2014
