= Goodenia maideniana =

Scientific classification
- Kingdom: Plantae
- Clade: Tracheophytes
- Clade: Angiosperms
- Clade: Eudicots
- Clade: Asterids
- Order: Asterales
- Family: Goodeniaceae
- Genus: Goodenia
- Species: G. maideniana

Binomial name
- Goodenia maideniana W.Fitzg.

Species of plant

Goodenia maideniana is a species of flowering plant in the family Goodeniaceae and is endemic to inland areas of Western Australia and the Northern Territory. It is a prostrate or low-lying herb with toothed, egg-shaped leaves at the base of the plant, and racemes of yellow flowers.

== Description ==
Goodenia maideniana is a prostrate or low-lying herb with stems up to 40 cm (16 in) long. It has toothed, egg-shaped leaves with the narrower end towards the base, at the base of the plant, 10–50 mm (0.39–1.97 in) long and 4–15 mm (0.16–0.59 in) wide on a petiole 15–35 mm (0.59–1.38 in) long. The flowers are arranged in racemes up to 350 mm (14 in) long with leaf-like bracts, each flower on a pedicel 3–4 mm (0.12–0.16 in) long. The sepals are oblong to elliptic, 3–4 mm (0.12–0.16 in) long, the petals yellow 12–15 mm (0.47–0.59 in) long. The lower lobes of the corolla are 5–6 mm (0.20–0.24 in) long with wings about 3 mm (0.12 in) wide. Flowering occurs from June to October and the fruit is an oval to cylindrical capsule up to 5 mm (0.20 in) long.

== Taxonomy and naming ==
Goodenia maideniana was first formally described in 1904 William Vincent Fitzgerald in the Journal of the West Australian Natural History Society. The specific epithet (maideniana) honours the botanist Joseph Maiden.

== Distribution and habitat ==
This goodenia grows near salt lakes on the southern edges of the Tanami, Gibson and Great Sandy Deserts, in Western Australia and the Northern Territory.

== Conservation status ==
Goodenia maideniana is classified as "not threatened" by the Government of Western Australia Department of Parks and Wildlife and as of "least concern" under the Northern Territory Government Territory Parks and Wildlife Conservation Act 1976.
